= The Shadow (performance art) =

Performance art by Abel Azcona

- Artist: Abel Azcona
- Year: 2014
- Medium: Performance Art Installation art
- Location: León, Soria, Tarragona, Castellón

The Shadow is a conceptual and performative work of critical, social and political content by artist Abel Azcona. In The Shadow, Azcona denounced cases of child abuse in a piece in which the survivors are the protagonists. In the work, Azcona presented more than two hundred actual cases of pedophilia in museums and galleries in various cities in Spain. At each show, Azcona gave a live performance from a wooden swing of the experiences of the survivors.

== Controversy ==
Azcona's work denounces child abuse and has been persecuted and denounced for being critical of the Christian Church in works such as The Shadow or Amen or The Pederasty. This last one was sued three times before the Superior Court of Justice of Navarra for three crimes and alleged desecration and blasphemy. The first one by the Archbishopric of Pamplona and Tudela, who are representatives of the Catholic Church in the north of Spain. The second one, by the Delegation of the Government in Navarra, controlled by the Popular Party at the time, and the third one by The Asociación Española de Abogados Cristianos (Spanish Association of Christian Lawyers), who also made criminal complaints against Azcona. The lawsuits were won by Azcona, however the group took the complaint to the Supreme Court.

== See also ==
- Performance Art
- Installation
- Endurance art
- Sexual abuse
- Pederasty
- Amen or The Pederasty
