= Piss Christ =

Controversial photograph by Andres Serrano

Piss Christ

Immersion (Piss Christ) is a 1987 photograph by the American artist and photographer Andres Serrano. It depicts a small plastic crucifix submerged in a small glass tank of the artist's urine. The piece was a winner of the Southeastern Center for Contemporary Art's "Awards in the Visual Arts" competition, which was sponsored in part by the National Endowment for the Arts, a United States Government agency that offers support and funding for artistic projects.

The work generated much controversy based on assertions that it was blasphemous. Serrano said of the controversy: "I had no idea Piss Christ would get the attention it did, since I meant neither blasphemy nor offense by it. I've been a Catholic all my life, so I am a follower of Christ."

== Description ==
The photograph is of a small plastic crucifix submerged in what appears to be an orange liquid. The artist described the substance as his own urine in a glass. The photograph was one of a series of photographs that Serrano had made that involved classical statuettes submerged in various fluids—milk, blood, and urine. It followed two years after Serrano's 1985 work, Blood Cross. The full title of the work is Immersion (Piss Christ). The photograph is a 60-by-40-inch (150 by 100 cm) Cibachrome print. It is glossy, and its colors are deeply saturated. The presentation is that of a golden, rosy medium, including a constellation of tiny bubbles. Without Serrano specifying the substance to be urine and without the artwork title referring to urine by another name, the viewer would not necessarily be able to differentiate between the stated medium of urine and a medium of similar appearances, such as amber or polyurethane.

Serrano has not ascribed overtly political content to Piss Christ and related artworks, stressing their ambiguity. He has also said that while this work is not intended to denounce religion, it alludes to the recent trend of commercializing or cheapening Christian icons in contemporary culture. Subsequently, he has explicitly rejected the assertion that he was motivated by blasphemy, saying instead that it was intended as a serious work of Christian art. He said, "What it symbolizes is the way Christ died: the blood came out of him but so did the piss and the shit. Maybe if Piss Christ upsets you, it's because it gives some sense of what the crucifixion actually was like...I was born and raised a Catholic and I've been a Christian all my life."

The art critic Lucy R. Lippard has presented a constructive case for the formal value of Serrano's Piss Christ, which she characterizes as mysterious and beautiful. She writes that the work is "a darkly beautiful photographic image… the small wood and plastic crucifix becomes virtually monumental as it floats, photographically enlarged, in a deep rosy glow that is both ominous and glorious." Lippard suggests that the formal values of the image can be regarded separately from other meanings.

== Reception ==
In 1987, Serrano's Piss Christ was exhibited at the Stux Gallery in New York and was favorably received. The piece later caused a scandal when it was exhibited in 1989, with detractors, including United States Senators Al D'Amato and Jesse Helms, outraged that Serrano received $15,000 for the work, and $5,000 in 1986 from the taxpayer-funded National Endowment for the Arts. Serrano received death threats and hate mail, and he lost grants due to the controversy. Others alleged that the government funding of Piss Christ violated the separation of church and state. The NEA's budget was then cut.

Sister Wendy Beckett, an art historian and Catholic nun, stated in a television interview with Bill Moyers that she regarded the work as not blasphemous but a statement on "what we are doing to Christ." Beckett said that she was tempted to say that Piss Christ might be "comforting art" which she defined as art that was easy to have an opinion and react to. She said, " ... they're not challenged in the slightest. Ninety percent of them think it's blasphemous, and few like me think, well, it might not be. It might be a rather ham-fisted attempt, to preach about the need to reverence the Crucifix. Not a very gifted young man but he's trying his best." "Real art," she continued, "makes demands."

During a retrospective of Serrano's work at the National Gallery of Victoria (NGV) in 1997, the then Catholic Archbishop of Melbourne, George Pell, sought an injunction from the Supreme Court of Victoria to restrain the National Gallery of Victoria from publicly displaying Piss Christ, which was not granted. Some days later, one patron attempted to remove the work from the gallery wall, and two teenagers later attacked it with a hammer. Gallery officials reported receiving death threats in response to Piss Christ. NGV Director Timothy Potts cancelled the show, allegedly out of concern for a Rembrandt exhibition that was also on display at the time. Supporters argued that the controversy over Piss Christ is an issue of artistic freedom and freedom of speech.

Piss Christ was included in "Down by Law", a "show within a show" on identity politics and disobedience that formed part of the 2006 Whitney Biennial. The British TV documentary Damned in the U.S.A., first shown by Channel 4 in its Without Walls arts series in 1991, explored the controversy surrounding Piss Christ, and interviewed Serrano about the work.

On April 17, 2011, a print of Piss Christ was vandalized "beyond repair" by Christian protesters while on display during the Je crois aux miracles (I believe in miracles) exhibition at the Collection Lambert, a contemporary art museum in Avignon, France. Serrano's photo The Church was similarly vandalized in the attack.

Beginning September 27, 2012, Piss Christ was on display at the Edward Tyler Nahem gallery in New York, at the Serrano show Body and Spirit. Religious groups and some lawmakers called for President Barack Obama to denounce the artwork, comparing it to the anti-Islamic film Innocence of Muslims that the White House had condemned earlier that month.

On October 14, 2022, Piss Christ was sold at a Sotheby's auction in London, UK for £130,000 (US$145,162).

On June 23, 2023, Andres Serrano was included among a group of artists invited to meet with Pope Francis in the Sistine Chapel as part of an effort to "broaden out the engagement of the church with artists" and to proclaim the church's commitment to supporting art that serves "to waken us up, call us to a new alertness and a new consciousness" about issues of social justice. During this meeting, the pope blessed Serrano and gave him a thumbs up gesture of approval. Serrano remarked, "I was very happy that the church understands that I am a Christian artist and I am not a blasphemous artist. I’m just an artist."

A copy was acquired by Tatxo Benet and added to his Censored Art Collection. It is displayed at the Museu de l'Art Prohibit in Barcelona, Spain.

== See also ==
- Censorship by religion
- Amen or The Pederasty
- God is Great (no. 2)
- Fountain (Duchamp)
- Grotesque body
- Transgressive art
- Scandals in art
- List of depictions of urine in art
- List of photographs considered the most important
