= Spain Asks for Forgiveness =

Art work by Abel Azcona

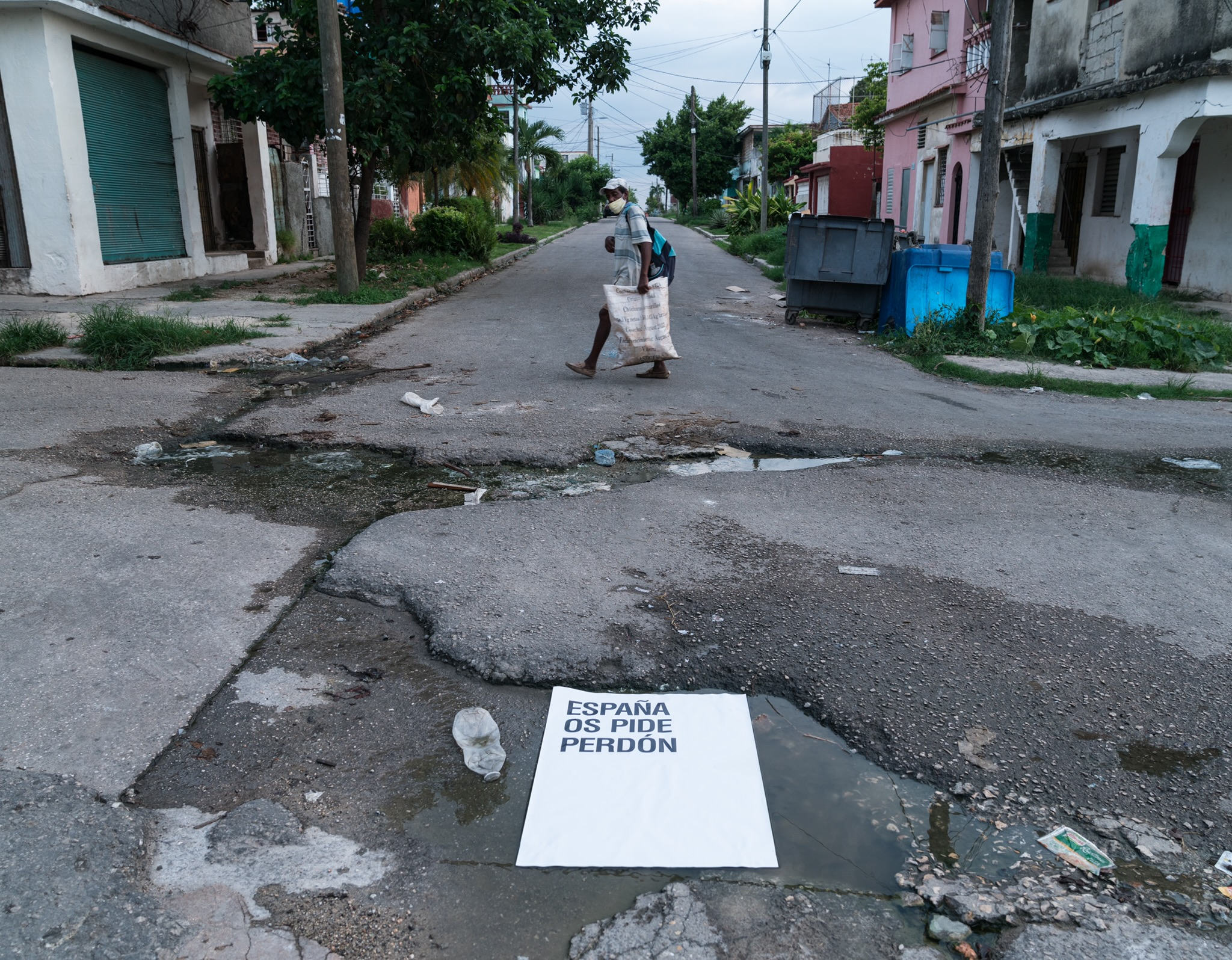
- Artist: Abel Azcona
- Year: 2018, 2019, 2020
- Medium: Performance art
- Location: Bogotá Contemporary Art Museum, Bogotá, Havana, Lima, Mexico City, Madrid

Spain Asks for Forgiveness is a conceptual and performative work of critical and anti-colonial content by recognized artist Abel Azcona. Created and started in Bogotá in November 2018 through a conference and a live performance by Azcona at the museum of contemporary art of Bogotá.

== Development ==
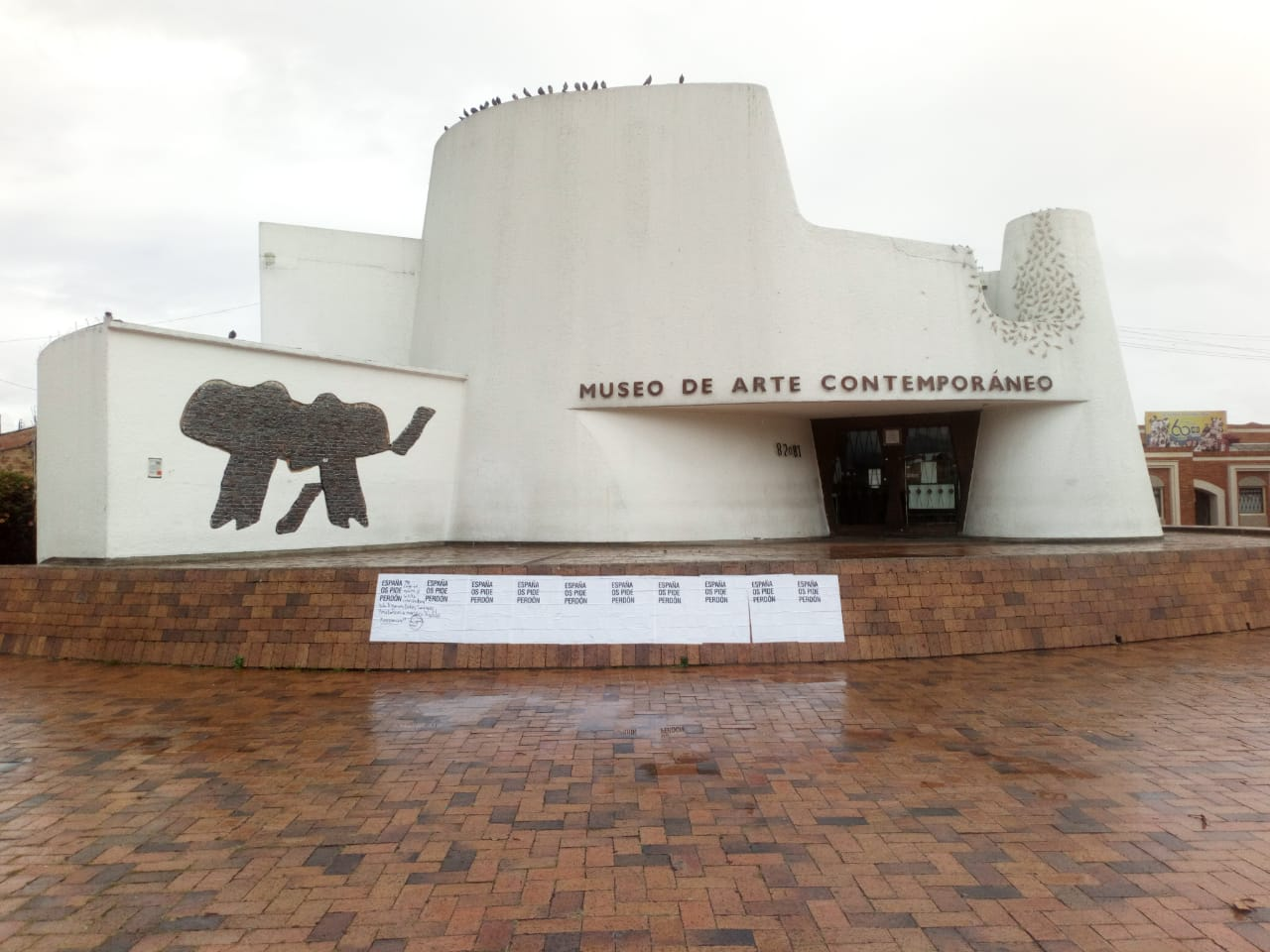
Spain asks for forgiveness (2020), by Abel Azcona installed in the Museum of Contemporary Art of Bogotá

In November 2018, through a conference and live performance by artist Abel Azcona in the Bogotá Contemporary Art Museum the work Spain Asks for Forgiveness (España os Pide Perdón in Spanish) began, a piece of critical and anticolonialist content. In the first performance, Azcona read a ninety-two-page text for more than four hours. In the reading, the quoted phrase Spain Asks for Forgiveness was repeated continuously. Two months later, Azcona was invited to present his work in Mexico City in the Mexico City Museum, where he installed a sailcloth with the same sentence on it. Just a few days later the president of Mexico Andrés Manuel López Obrador during a press conference demanded publicly an apology from Spain. Since then until mid 2020, the work has been shown in diverse ways and has achieved to become a collective movement. In May 2020 the Bogotá Contemporary Art Museum painted its facade with the installation's motto España os pide perdón for two months in the centre of the city of Bogotá. Other cities such as Havana, Cuba; Lima, Peru; Caracas, Venezuela; Panama City, Panama; Tegucigalpa, Honduras and Quito, Ecuador have been protagonists of the piece through paintings, sailcloths, posters or demonstrations and collective acts continuing the work as a collective protest.

== See also ==
- Installation art
- Endurance art
