= File 09812 =

Performance art by Abel Azcona

- Artist: Abel Azcona
- Year: 2015
- Medium: Performance art
- Location: Palace of the Arts, Contemporary Art Fair of Mediterranean; Castellón de la Plana, Spain

File 09812 is a conceptual and performative work of critical and biographical content by artist Abel Azcona. The artist shows, in an art installation and documentary way, his Social Welfare file, fully exposed in various occasions. These documents speak of a child in a situation of total abandonment, with visible signs of abuse, neglect and malnutrition, and testimonies from neighbors and the environment are provided confirming that the child could be left for weeks in total solitude in the apartment, which did not meet the minimum habitability conditions. The documentary installation is accompanied by a performative reading of each of the pages of the file by Abel Azcona himself. The artwork was responsible for inaugurating the International Contemporary Art Fair of the Mediterranean. The work was part of the retrospective exhibition dedicated to the artist by the city of Pamplona in 2015.

Disturbing and disconcerting. Intimate and emotional. Abel Azcona, who had already been seen by the fair, walks barefoot and dressed completely in black on the esplanade of the Palau de la Festa and surroundings. He stands among the people, who await him. He gets on stage with some papers. File No. 09812 begins. Azcona stands facing the public, who is staring, and begins to read the file. And so, among the coldness of those mechanical words and administrative jargon, his childhood is recounted; prostitute mother, drug addict father, from house to house (from bar to bar and brothel to brothel), environments in which a child should never be found, social services, an expensive attempt at adoption by a foster family and even sexual abuse. A long process that evidences a hard childhood. Azcona finishes reading File No. 09812, his file (which he leaves on stage). He finishes and gets off the platform, leaves the esplanade and walks through the surroundings in tears until Enrique Bocángelus, director of the International Contemporary Art Fair of the Mediterranean Mars, approaches him and they merge into a hug. People, meanwhile, read the file, perhaps trying to understand why a child has to go through something like that or simply thanking him for being able to expose it that way. Mars is silent, and that is only the first day.

— Asun Pérez, International Contemporary Art Fair of the Mediterranean, 2019

== See also ==
- Installation art
- Endurance art
