= Empathy and Prostitution =

Performance art by Abel Azcona

- Artist: Abel Azcona
- Year: 2013
- Medium: Performance art
- Location: Bogotá, Madrid, Houston

Empathy and Prostitution is a conceptual and performative work of critical and biographical content by artist Abel Azcona. Azcona was inspired by his biological mother, a prostitute, and sought to empathise with her and with the moment of his own conception. Azcona offered himself naked to the galleries' visitors on a bed with white sheets, so that they could exchange intimacy or have sexual relations with him.

== Location ==
It was created and first performed in the Santa Fe Gallery, Bogotá in February 2013. The work had a second performance at the Factoría de Arte y Desarrollo, an artistic space in Madrid, in November 2013, and there was a third performance at the Houston International Performance Biennial, in February 2014.

== Exhibitions ==
Photographs, drawings and documentation of the work were part of the Art Is Hope charity exhibitions in Paris and Pride in New York. The former exhibiting in museums such as Palais de Tokyo and the Perrotin Gallery, and also displayed at the Piasa auction house in Paris. The New York exhibition and auction at Paddle8 promoted sexual diversity and featured artists such as Haring, Bourgeois, Goldin, Mapplethorpe, Warhol or Azcona himself. In 2017 there were also exhibitions in museums such as the Tulla Center in the Albanian capital Tirana. The Juan Gallery in Madrid, which specializes in performance art, included this work in a retrospective exhibition, The Extinction of Desire, which focused on works with sexual themes.

== Evolution ==
Following on with the same concepts as Empathy and Prostitution, the inaugural 2014 Queer New York Arts Festival was opened with a work by Azcona entitled Someone Else. In this, physical or even sexual contact with the artist was required to enter the venue of the event, which was held at Grace Exhibition Space and the Leslie-Lohman Museum of Art in New York City. This work was chosen by critic Hrag Vartanian as one of the top ten of the year in New York City. At the end of 2014 and the early part of 2015, Azcona explored the processual work La Calle ("the street") this time in the Santa Fe neighborhood of Bogotá, where he prostitutes himself on the streets. In this new work, he explored a change towards the figure of his mother, taking hormones and engaging in prostitution. The process continued in the cities of Madrid and Mexico City. The performance emerged, as with the rest of his sex-themed works, as an exercise in empathy with his own biological mother. It was also a social critique, where the artist explored the limits of his body by repeating patterns of sexual abuse, which occurred in his own childhood and in the life of his mother. In 2016, Azcona activated his last piece in this series, La Guerra (The War), which premiered at the Intramurs Festival in Valencia, Spain, which was again inspired by prostitution, criticism and sexuality. On this occasion, Azcona offered his naked body, anesthetized by the use of narcotics, so that the visitor could use it freely.

== Bibliography ==
- Huerta, Ricard (2019). Elementary Art. Pedagogías Contemporáneas - UOC. ISBN 978-8491805526.
- Peñuela, Jorge (2017). Anarchaegraphy of artistic thought (in Spanish). UD Creaciones. ISBN 978-9585434172.
- Group FIDEX, Figures of excess and body policies (2018). Technical-conceptual atlas of the Fidex research group: Micropolitics in contemporary research in Fine Arts (in Spanish). Universitas Miguel Hernández. ISBN 978-8416024711.
- Moya Gómez, Carlos (2016). A vision of gender through performance in today's Spain (PDF) (in Spanish). Universitat Pompeu Fabra.
- Silva Gómez, Norma Ángelica (2018). Abel Azcona: Of empathy as (im) possibility (in Spanish). Colegio de Saberes de México.
- López Landabaso, Patricia (2017). La performance como medio de expresión artística. Expresiones actuales en el País Vasco (PDF) (in Spanish). Universidad del País Vasco.
- Cano Martínez, Maria Jesús (2018). Escondido tras la piel: representaciones y afrontamientos del dolor y el sufrimiento desde el arte de acción (in Spanish). Universidad de Granada. ISBN 9788491639541.
- Molina Ruiz, Irene (2016). El autorretrato como canalizador del dolor (in Spanish). University of Granada. ISBN 9788491258148.

== See also ==
- Installation art
- Endurance art
- Drugs and prostitution
