= Transgressive art =

Art that intends to outrage or violate basic morals and sensibilities

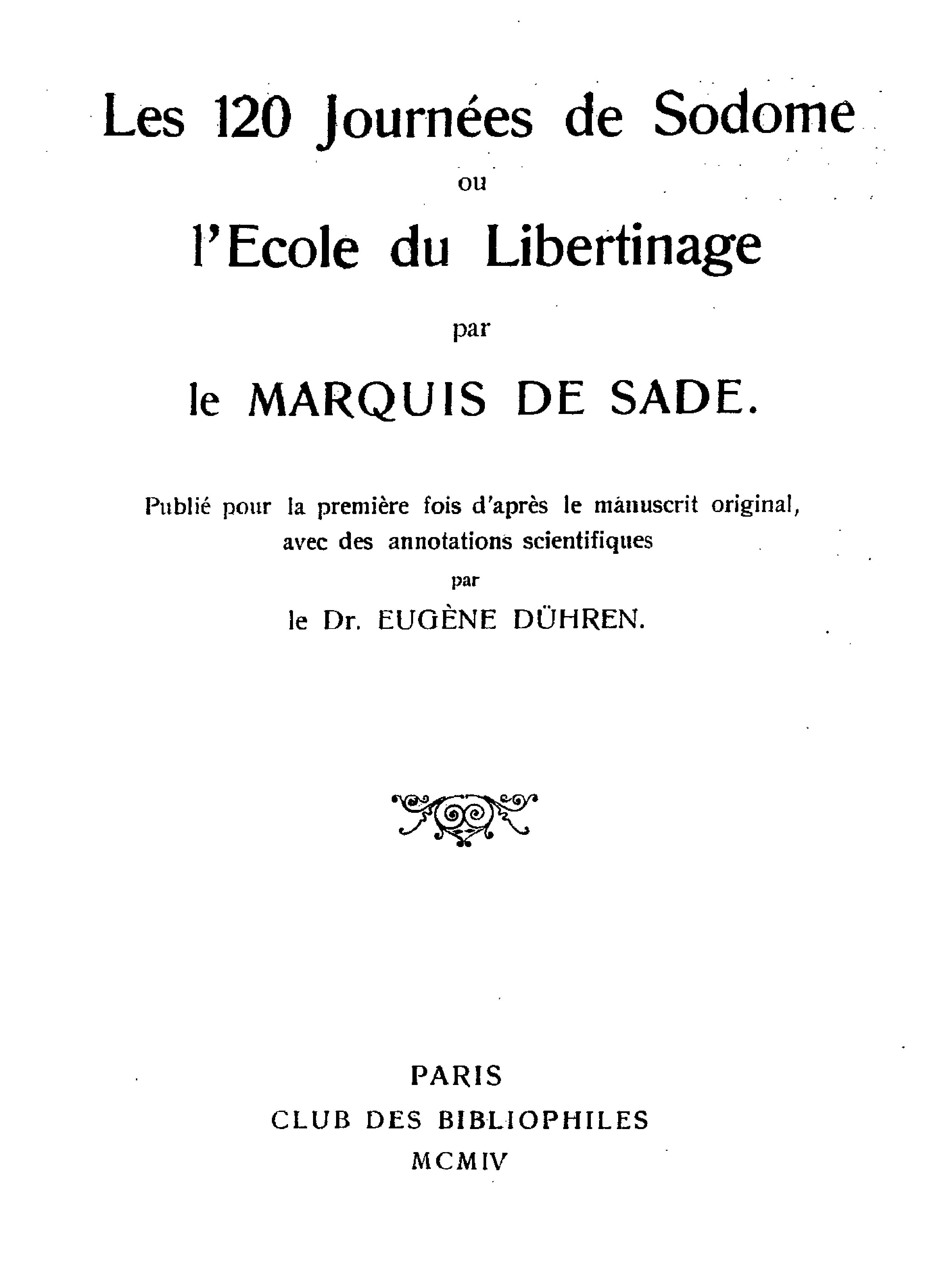
The Marquis de Sade's The 120 Days of Sodom (1904), a work noted for its extreme depictions of sexual violence and cruelty.

Transgressive art refers to artistic practices that violate or challenge established boundaries, conventions, or taboos. Transgression may be directed against the conventions of the art world itself, the moral or religious sensibilities of an audience, or wider social and legal norms. Subjects that transgressive art might engage with can include sex and sexuality, violence, the body, religion, or obscenity or profanity.

Well-known examples of transgressive art include Marcel Duchamp's Fountain (1917), Andres Serrano's Piss Christ (1987), and Chris Ofili's The Holy Virgin Mary (1996). In literature, works commonly associated with transgression include American Psycho (1991) and the work of Kathy Acker, while cinematic examples include Salò, or the 120 Days of Sodom or underground films connected to the Cinema of Transgression.

The term is often applied retrospectively by critics and art historians rather than adopted by artists themselves. What constitutes transgression also varies considerably according to the social, cultural, and artistic conventions of a particular time and place; what is transgressive in one context may become conventional in another.

== Definition ==
There is no single form of transgressive art. Anthony Julius, in Transgressions: The Offences of Art (2002), identifies three broad forms of artistic transgression: works that violate established artistic rules or conventions; works that break taboos or offend the beliefs or sensibilities of their audiences; and works that challenge or disobey legal and political authority.

'Transgression' is therefore not synonymous with shock or controversy. Rather, a work may be transgressive through its rejection or artistic conventions or confrontation with religious, political, or institutional boundaries.

The concept of transgression has also been influential in philosophy and critical theory. In the work of Georges Bataille, for example, transgression is closely linked to taboo. For Bataille, an act is transgressive because if violates an existing rule or taboo: something can only be transgressive if there is an existing social, moral, or cultural boundary for it to violate.

== In visual art ==
Transgression has taken a number of forms in visual art, ranging from challenges to artistic conventions to the deliberate violation of social, religious, and bodily taboos.

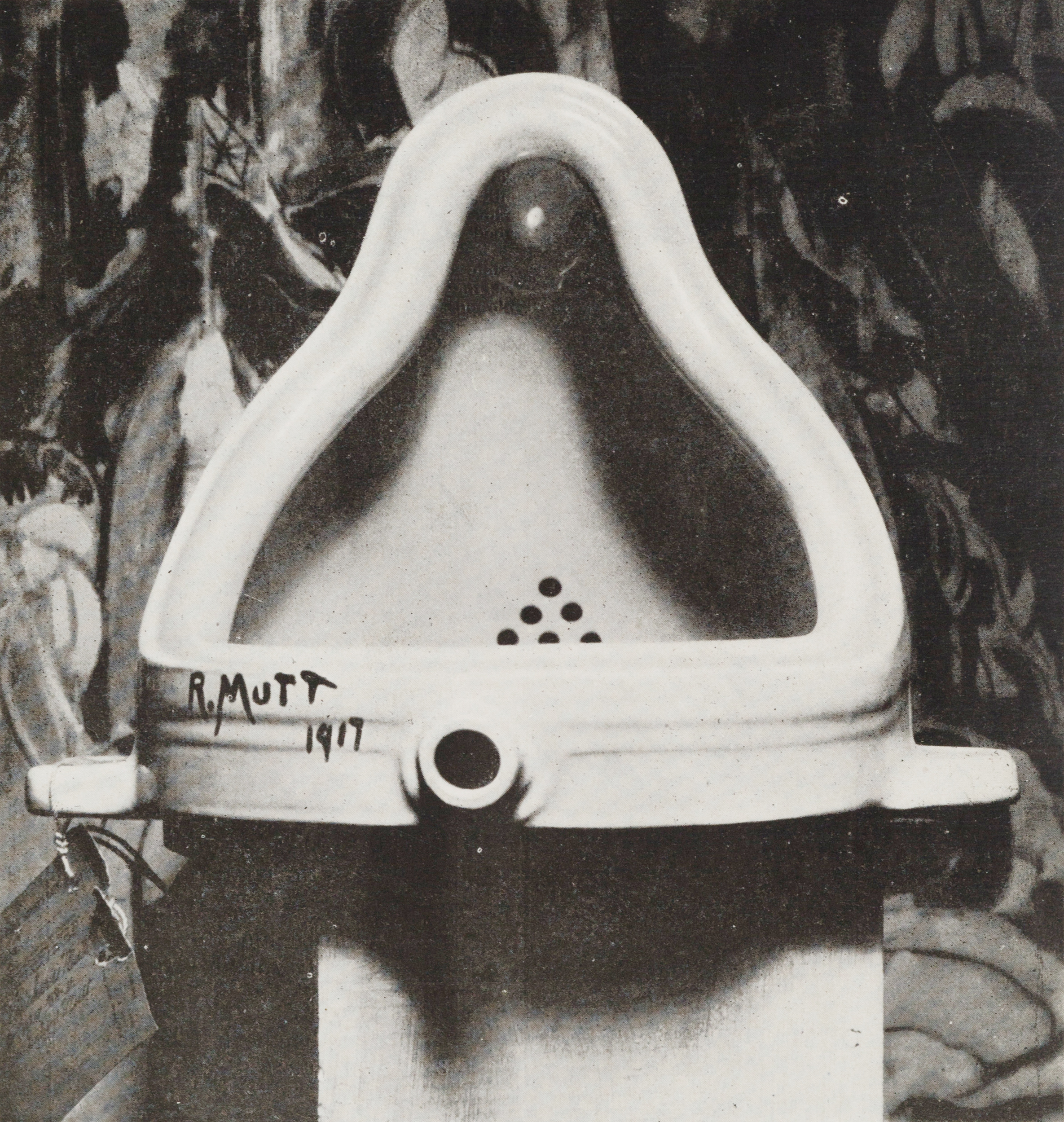
Marcel Duchamp's Fountain, a 1917 artwork that challenged established conventions about what constituted 'art'.

Marcel Duchamp's Fountain (1917), a porcelain urinal submitted to an exhibition under the name 'R. Mutt', became an important precedent for art that challenged conventional distinctions between artworks and ordinary objects.

The work provoked heated debate among the exhibition's organisers, and ultimately they refused to display it; Duchamp resigned from the Society of Independent Artists in protest.

Its use of a urinal as an artwork, though open to interpretation, was deliberately provocative: in 1961, fellow Dadaist Hans Richter wrote to Duchamp that he had "[thrown] the bottle rack and the urial into their faces as a challenge". Duchamp marked his approval of this statement in the margins of the letter.

=== 1960s and 1970s ===
During the 1960s, transgressive practices in visual art became increasingly associated with performance and the body. The Viennese Actionists, for example, staged provocative public performances involving nudity, blood, bodily fluids, and religious imagery, designed to challenge the social conservatism of post-war Austria.

The Actionists' deliberate violation of taboos frequently provoked public outrage and in some cases resulted in prosecution. On one occasion, at the Kunst und Revolution event at the University of Vienna in 1968, Actionist Günter Brus performed an 'Action' involving urination, self-harm, defecation and masturbation – all while singing the Austrian national anthem. This causes a public scandal, and Brus was subsequently sentenced to six months' imprisonment for "degrading Austrian symbols"; he later fled to West Berlin to avoid his sentence. In a 2018 New York Times interview, Brus claimed that his aim was "to break taboos... My art doesn’t just stink in the physical space but smells in the souls of the people."

Transgression also became an important strategy in feminist art, where artists would use their bodies to challenge conventions around female sexuality, nudity, and representation in the art world. Carolee Schneemann, a pioneering figure in feminist performance art, worked to "disrupt and displace the conventional expectations of what an appealing looks, appealing, arousing body could do or mean in its culture." Discussing her work in a 2009 interview, Schneemann described her artistic vision of articulating "the pleasures of the body, the energy of the body, the intelligence of the body. I couldn't find it anywhere as I imagined it might be.

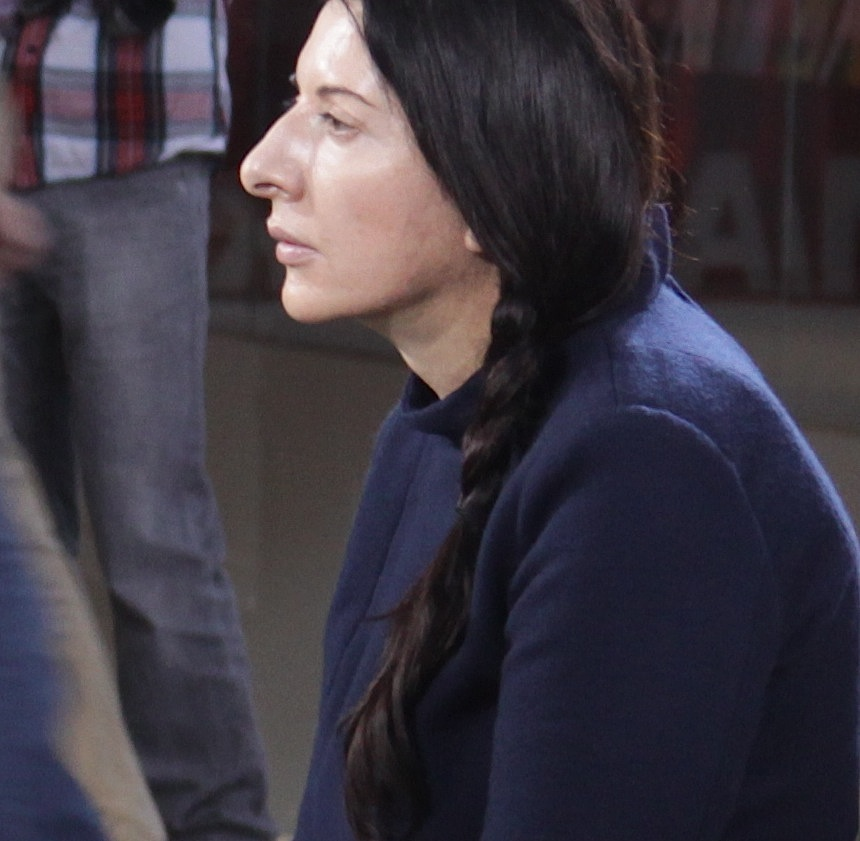
Marina Abramović at the Museum of Modern Art in 2010. Photograph by Shelby Lessig, CC BY-SA 3.0.

In Meat Joy (1964), Schneemann writhed with other nude performers in raw fish, chicken, paint, and paper; one performance was temporarily interrupted by an angry audience member who dragged Schneemann off the stage and began to strangle her, before being stopped by two other audience members. In Interior Scroll (1975), Schneemann pulled a scroll from her vagina and read from it, the text addressing the marginalisation of women's bodies in the art world. Other women performance artists including Yoko Ono, Marina Abramović and Ana Mendieta have also used the body as a site of transgression, testing boundaries around sexuality and socially acceptable behaviour.

Transgression was also characteristic of the underground comix movement. Robert Crumb, one of its most prominent figures, used explicit sexuality, racist stereotypes, and grotesque charicature in work that deliberately violated conventional moral standards and conventions within mainstream American comics. Writing in The Guardian, Crumb says that he "got tired of the label America's Best-Loved Cartoonist... I decided to be more brave about what was coming out. I still wanted to entertain, but I wanted to push the boundaries."

=== 1980s and 1990s ===
By the late 1980s, debates around transgressive art increasingly moved beyond the art world into wider political and legal disputes over obscenity, censorship and feedom of expression.

Dread Scott's 1988 installation, What is the Proper Way to Display a U.S. Flag?, which invited visitors to stand on an American flag while responding to his work, provoked national controversy. In 1990, in United States v. Eichman, the Supreme Court eventually ruled that it was unconstitutional for the government to prohibit an artwork that desecrates the American flag, finding that it was protected expression under the First Amendment.

Another artist, Robert Mapplethorpe, became another prominent figure in such debates. His retrospective exhibition The Perfect Moment, which included photographs depicting BDSM and sadomasochism, led Contemporary Arts Center director Dennis Barrie to be indicted on obscenity charges in 1990; he was acquitted of all charges.

=== Contemporary art ===
Taboo aspects of the body continued to feature prominently in transgressive art. Andres Serrano's Piss Christ, a photograph of a plastic crucifix submerged in the artist's urine, became a major focus of public debate after its funding by the National Endowment for the Arts prompted accusations of blasphemy. Serrano himself rejected the idea that the work was blasphemous: "I had no idea Piss Christ would get the attention it did, since I meant neither blasphemy nor offense by it. I've been a Catholic all my life, so I am a follower of Christ."

Artists associated with the Young British Artists (YBA) movement in Britain during the 1990s also attracted attention for their transgressive work. Tracey Emin's My Bed (1998) depicted her unmade bed surrounded by personal objects including condoms, alcohol, stained bedsheets, underwear with menstrual blood stains, and other everyday items.

Later, performance artists Yuan Cai and Jian Jun Xi jumped on the bed to "improve" the work before being removed by security guards; Cai stated that the pair wanted to "push the idea further".

Jake and Dinos Chapman, also associated with the YBAs, regularly created transgressive pieces of work; Fuck Face (1994), one of their most notorious pieces, features a mannequin of a child whose nose and mouth are replaced by a penis and anus. Recalling the delivery of the work to the gallerist Victoria Miro, Dinos Chapman told the Guardian that he had "never been in such a silent place". Miro then placed a tea towel over the sculpture's head when Chapman left the gallery.

Chris Ofili's The Holy Virgin Mary garnered similar controversy. The work, depicting a Black Madonna created with elephant dung and images from pornographic magazines, was condemned by a range of public figures including Rudy Giuliani, who subsequently attempted to withdraw the museum's municipal funding.

Performance-based practices continued to explore bodily, religious and political taboos in the twenty-first century. Ron Athey, whose work emerged in the late 1980s, has used blood, ritual and bodily pain in performances addressing queer identity, religion and the experience of AIDS. A 2021 retrospective at the Institute of Contemporary Art, Los Angeles, examined the relationship between his work and the political controversies surrounding performance art in the 1990s. Guatemalan artist Regina José Galindo has employed her body in performances confronting political violence. In Who Can Erase the Traces? (2003), she walked through Guatemala City leaving bloody footprints in protest against the presidential candidacy of former dictator Efraín Ríos Montt.

Other artists have challenged the ethical boundaries of artistic participation. Santiago Sierra has paid participants to undertake physically invasive or degrading activities, using these transactions to examine economic exploitation and the commodification of labour. His projects have also prompted criticism of the power relationships reproduced within the artworks themselves. The performance artist Cassils has used bodybuilding and physically demanding performances to challenge conventional representations of gender and the body. In Becoming an Image, Cassils strikes a large clay sculpture in darkness, with the action made visible to the audience through intermittent photographic flashes. The work addresses violence against transgender and queer people.

The Austrian art collective monochrom has used satire and participatory performance to examine the mechanisms of artistic provocation. Its 2003 performance Eignblunzn, part of the group's Wiener Faktionismus project, involved the public consumption of blood sausage made from the artists' own blood. Writing in Der Standard, art critic Helmut Ploebst described the work as a test of the tabloid media's response to provocation, contrasting its reception with the scandals surrounding 1960s Viennese Actionism.

Another monochrom project, Buried Alive, began in 2005 and invited volunteers to be placed in coffins and temporarily buried underground. During a presentation at the Contemporary Art Gallery in Vancouver, participants remained buried for approximately ten minutes. Reviewing the exhibition in The Georgia Straight, Robin Laurence discussed the performance in relation to Austrian cultural associations with death and contemporary entertainment centred on extreme experiences.

Austrian choreographer and performance artist Florentina Holzinger has incorporated nudity, physical risk and explicit religious imagery into contemporary dance, theatre and opera. Her 2024 production Sancta, based on Paul Hindemith's Sancta Susanna, combined Catholic liturgical structures with sexual imagery, bodily injury and performers suspended by hooks through their skin. Reviewing the production in Spike Art Magazine, Florian Malzacher examined its feminist treatment of religious ritual and its relationship to the legacy of Viennese Actionism.

== In literature ==
Literature has also been a form through which artists have expressed transgressive ideas, as well as being the site of legal and political disputes over obscenity and freedom of expression.

=== Early work ===
There are multiple early literary precedents that challenged prevailing moral, sexual, and religious mores.

The writings of the Marquis de Sade are frequently regarded as an important precursor to later transgressive works. In his libertine novels in particular, characters engage in incest, sodomy, rape,coprophilia, necrophilia, and murder. Sadism – the pleasure of giving pain or humiliation – was subsequently named after Sade.

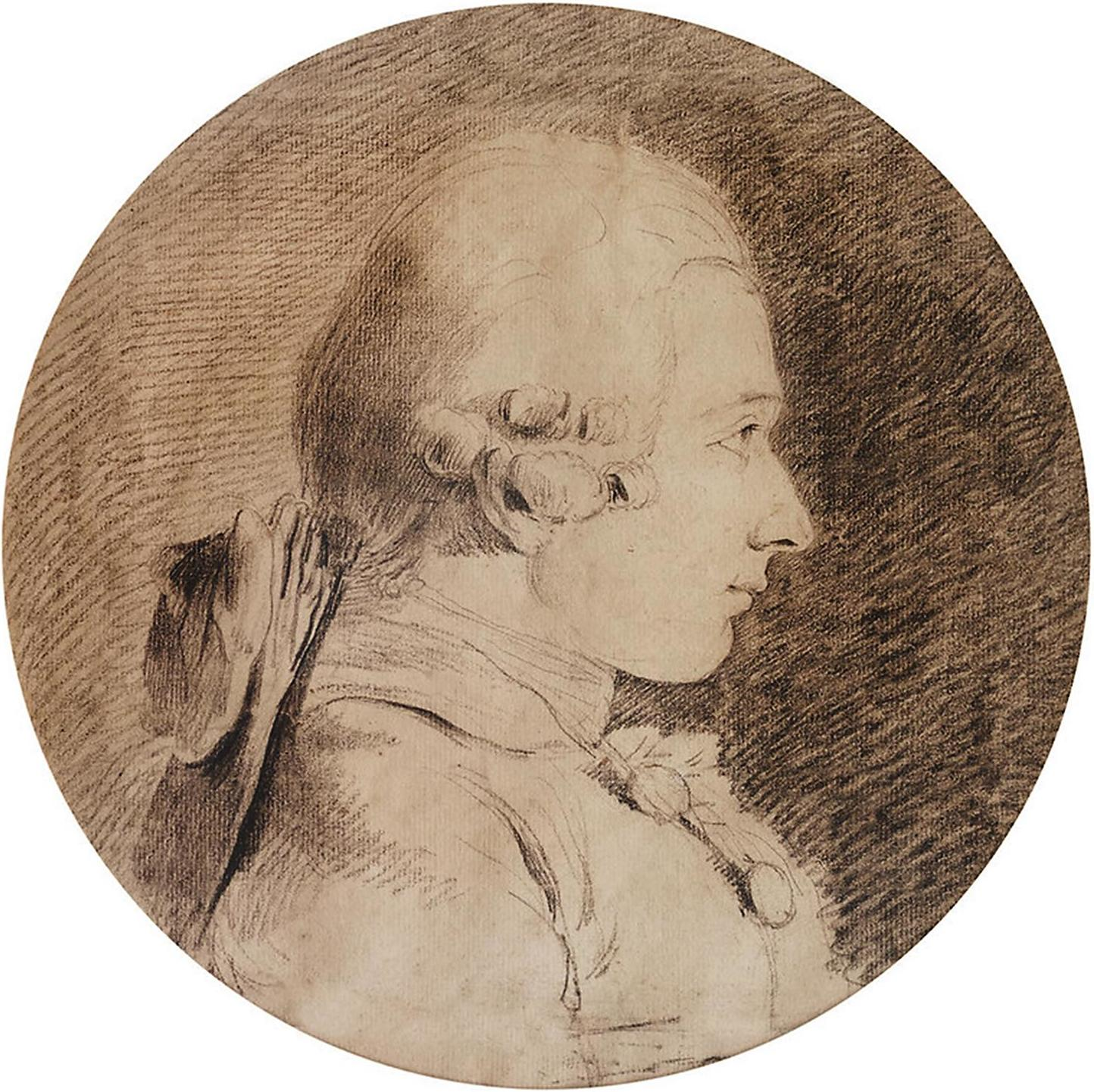
The Marquis de Sade, whose sexually explicit and violent writings became an important precursor to later theories of literary transgression.

Though Sade's work is best known for its explicit depictions of sex, violence, and cruelty, it has also been interpreted as a broader challenge to conventional ideas about morality, religion, and humanity's relationship with God. As Michel Foucault argues in A Preface to Transgression, Sade was a pivotal figure in the development of a modern language of sexuality, linking it to the crossing of moral and religious limits. Beginning with Sade, Foucault writes, “the language of sexuality has lifted us into the night where God is absent”.

In the nineteenth century, challenges to prevailing moral conventions also brought writers into conflict with obscenity laws. Charles Baudelaire's Les Fleurs du Mal, published in 1857 and covering themes including lesbianism, death, and sex, caused public outcry. Both Baudelaire and his publishers were prosecuted for crimes against public morality; a ban on six of his poems was not overturned until 1949.

=== 20th century literature ===
As in the world of visual arts, literary transgression became increasingly swept up in wider debates about censorship and freedom of speech as the 20th century went on. James Joyce's Ulysses was banned as obscene until 1933, while D.H. Lawrence's Lady Chatterley's Lover was subject to similar censorship. When Penguin Books published a version of the book in Britain in 1960, it was prosecuted under the Obscene Publications Act 1959, though it was eventually acquitted.

French theorist Georges Bataille was a key figure in 20th century transgressive art, contributing both fiction and theoretical works on the topic. Story of the Eye, a fictional account of increasingly extreme sexual games, is sometimes considered a "Surrealist anti-Bildungsroman": an account of the "dissolution of desire into abjection" which has had clear influence on later writers including Kathy Acker. Bataille subsequently developed his theory of transgression through theoretical work including Eroticism (1957), linking sex work, incest, marriage, murder, and sadism to religious life and other social codes. Other twentieth-century writers associated with transgression include Jean Genet, William S. Burroughs, J.G. Ballard, Chuck Palahniuk, Bret Easton Ellis, and Dennis Cooper.

=== Gender, sexuality, and the body ===
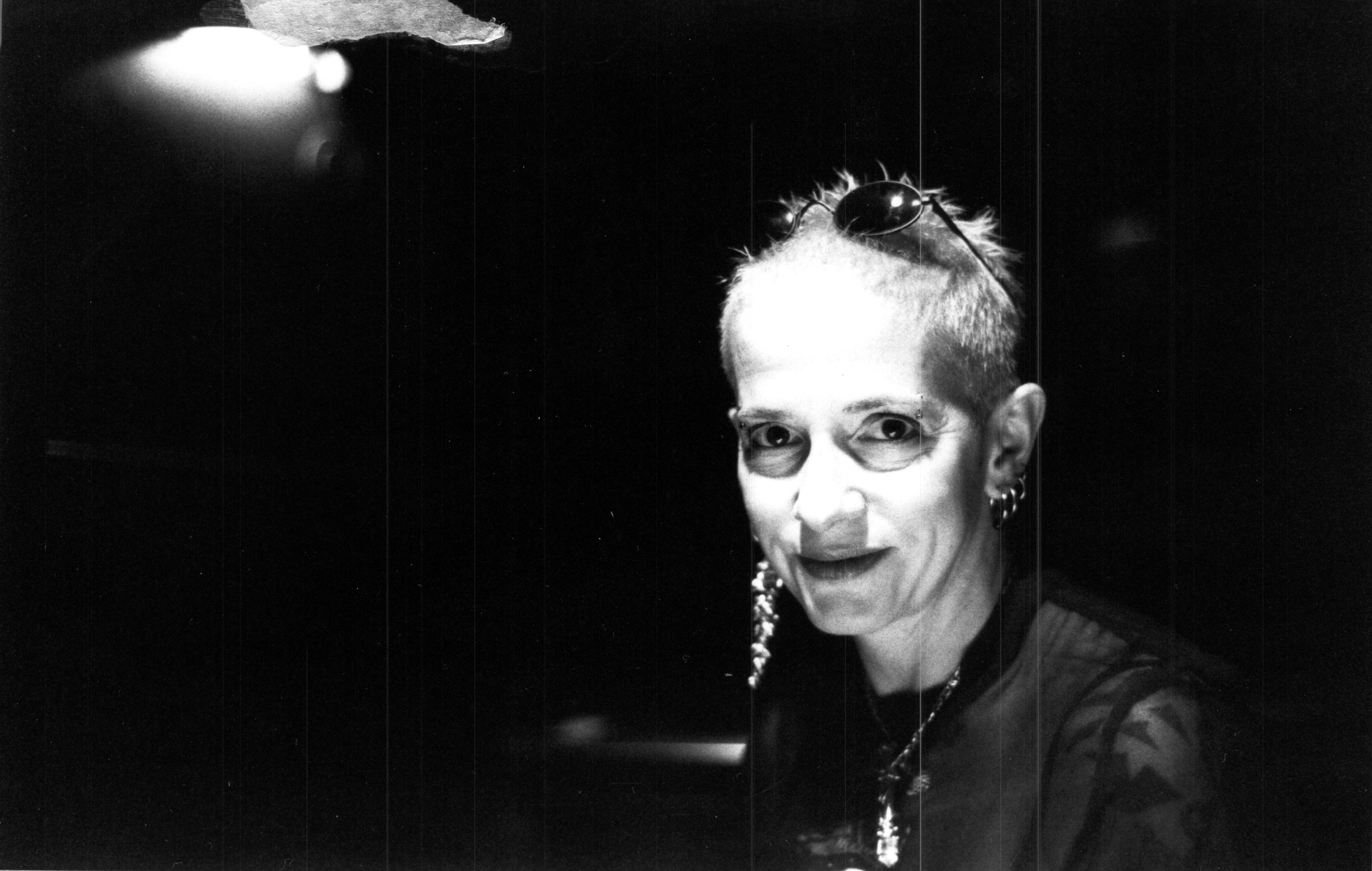
Kathy Acker used experimental literary forms to explore themes including rape, violence, and sadomasochism.

Transgressive writing has also provided a means of challenging established ideas around gender, sexuality, and the body. Pauline Réage – the pen name of journalist Anne Desclos – explored female submission in her Story of O, which follows a woman willingly submitting to increasinly extreme forms of sadomasochistic violence. Angela Carter later reworked fairy tales through the lens of sexual violence and desire in The Bloody Chamber, while experimental writer Kathy Acker explored themes of power, sex, and violence using pastiche and the cut-up technique.

Blood and Guts in High School, Acker's most popular book, combines fragments of prose with drawings and sexually explicit material to explore incest, rape and exploitation; the work is transgressive both in subject matter, which is taboo, and in its experimental form. As literary theorist Susan E. Hawkins writes, the book is "aesthetically outrageous, unrepentantly political, and singularly offensive."

Black writers have also used transgression to explore issues of race and marginalisation. Aliyyah I. Abdur-Rahman argues that Black writers have historically used depictions of erotic transgression in particularly to contest "popular theories of identity, pathology, national belonging, and racial difference in American culture", leading to a specific African-American form of "literary expression, modes of political intervention and cultural self-fashioning."

Examples of such work include James Baldwin, who explored homosexuality interracial desire through his novels and Samuel R. Delany, with his explicit depictions of sex and social taboos.

== In film ==
Cinema has provided a particularly prominent medium for transgressive art. The history of transgressive cinema has consequently been closely connected to censorship, with works variously banned or denied distribution because of their content.

=== Early cinema ===
Early examples of transgressive cinema emerged partly from the European avant-garde, where filmmakers used the medium to play around with artistic, sexual, and religious conventions. Luis Buñuel and Salvador Dalí's Un Chien Andalou rejected conventional narrative in favour of suggestive, disturbing imagery; the film famously opens with a sequence in which a woman's eye appears to be sliced open with a razor. Discussion the film in his autobiography, Buñuel states that they had only one rule: "No idea or image that might lend itself to a rational explanation of any kind would be accepted.”

Buñuel's next film, 1930's L'Âge d'Or, also aimed at bourgeois morality and organised religion, leading to protests by right-wing groups who "threw ink on the screen, vandalized the furniture, and ruined the adjoining exhibition of surrealist paintings". The film was subsequently prohibited from public exhibition by the police.

=== Post-war and underground cinema ===
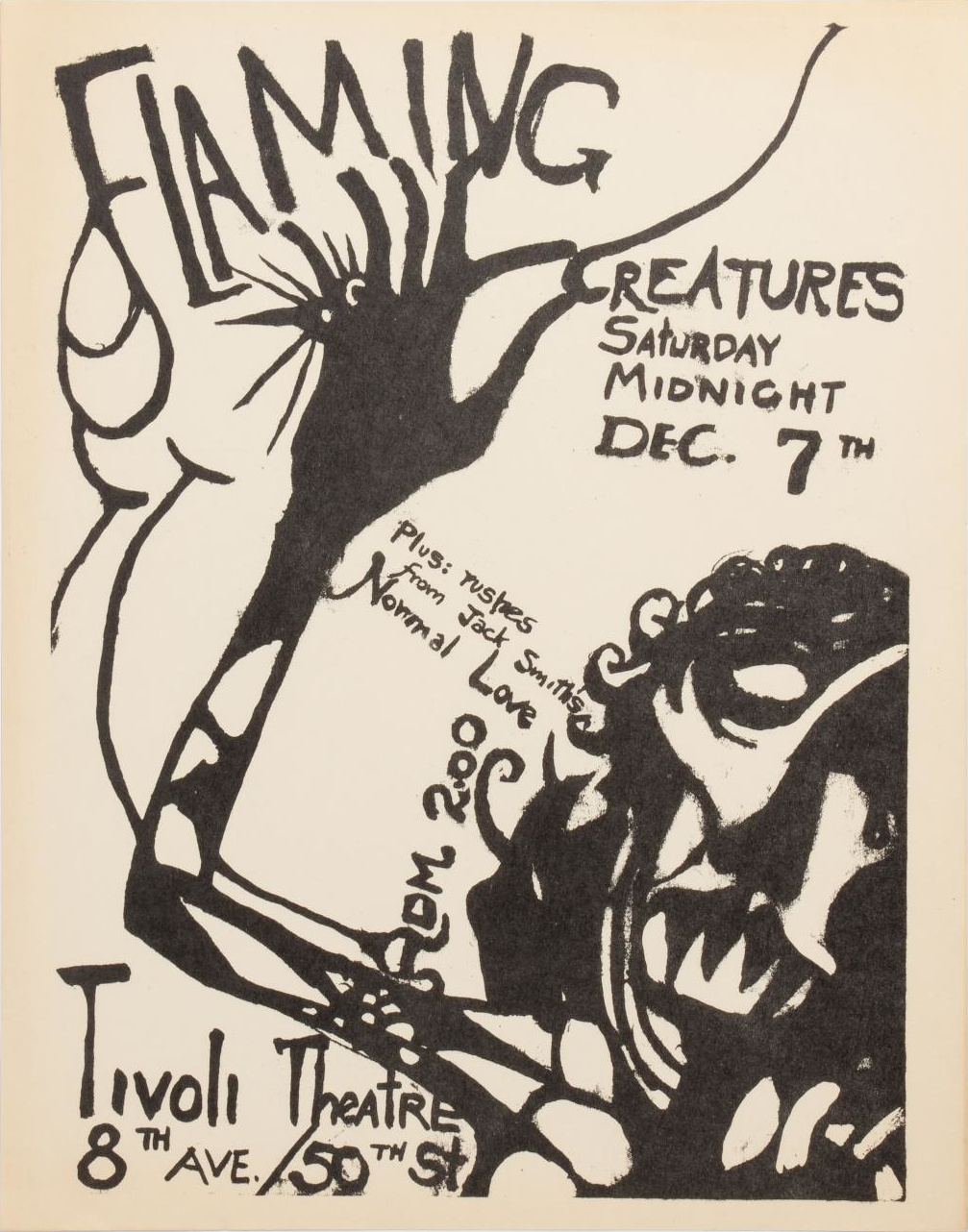
Poster for a 1963 screening of Flaming Creatures at the Tivoli Theatre.

In the post-war period, transgression became associated with experimental and underground cinema. Kenneth Anger's Fireworks (1947) combined homoeroticism with violence and sadomasochistic imagery, and became the subject of an obscenity case.

Jack Smith's Flaming Creatures (1963), featuring cross-dressing and nudity, was similarly subject to censorship, with screenings raided by the police and the film ruled obscene. The film deliberately blurred boundaries between masculine and feminine identities, challenging ideas of sexuality and their presentation on screen. Jonas Mekas, who was arrested for screening the film, and Susan Sontag became prominent defenders of the film.

The duty of the artist, Mekas wrote, was to "ignore bad laws and fight them every moment of his life... It is my duty to bring to your attention the ridiculousness and illegality of the licensing and obscenity laws."

=== 1970s onwards ===
During the seventies, filmmakers continued to push representations of sex and violence beyond the limits of the mainstream. John Waters' Pink Flamingos deliberately embraced obscenity: its lead character, Babs Johnson, competes for the title of "the filthiest person alive" declaring "filth is my life!". The film culminates with Babs eating dog faeces, an act performed unsimulated by actor Divine in one of the film's most notorious moments.

Pier Paolo Pasolini's Salò, or the 120 Days of Sodom, adapted the Marquis de Sade's novel, moving its sadomasochism to Fascist Italy in an allegory about fascism and power. The film, split into cycles of blood, mania, and excrement, was intended to represent "what power does to the human body": “today one needs to fight the power exercised over man’s body as much as in his time one needed to oppose the power exercised over his beliefs," Pasolini told Gideon Bachmann shortly before his death in 1975.

=== 1980s: Cinema of Transgression ===
The term 'Cinema of Transgression' was coined during the 1980s by New York filmmaker Nick Zedd, who published his manifesto in 1985. Filmmakers associated with the movement, who included Zedd and singer Lydia Lunch, used low-budget filmmaking to depict taboo subjects and reject mainstream cinematic conventions. In the manifesto, Zedd argued that "all film schools be blown up and all boring films [should] never be made again";

"We who have violated the laws, commands and duties of the avant-gaede: i.e. to bore, tranquilize and obfuscate through a fluke process dictated by practical convenience stand guilty as charged... We propose to go beyond all limits set or prescribed by taste, morality, or any other traditional value system shackling the minds of men."

=== Contemporary film ===
Transgressive cinema continued into the late twentieth and twenty-first centuries. Catherine Breillat has explored the boundaries between pornography and art in films including Romance, Fat Girl, and Anatomy of Hell, while Lars von Trier has attracted controversy for films including Nymphomaniac, Breaking the Waves, and Antichrist.

Breillat's work has also been associated with the New French Extremity movement, a term applied to a number of films considered extreme and transgressive. Other filmmakers associated with this group are Gaspar Noé, Claire Denis, and Bruno Dumont.

Critic Tim Palmer describes such work:

"This cinéma du corps consists of arthouse dramas and thrillers with deliberately discomfiting features: dispassionate physical encounters involving filmed sex that is sometimes unsimulated; physical desire embodied by the performances of actors or nonprofessionals as harshly insular; intimacy itself depicted as fundamentally aggressive, devoid of romance, lacking a nurturing instinct or empathy of any kind; and social relationships that disintegrate in the face of such violent compulsions."

== In music ==
Transgression in popular music has often involved challenges to conventions around sexuality, obscenity, religion and acceptable public behaviour. Artists associated with punk rock and its offshoots deliberately embraced provocation: the Sex Pistols attracted censorship and controversy through profanity and attacks on established institutions, while performers including GG Allin pushed transgression towards physical extremes through performances involving nudity, violence, self-harm and bodily fluids. Industrial and experimental groups such as Throbbing Gristle similarly incorporated deliberately disturbing imagery and taboo subjects into their music and performances, while lead vocalist Genesis P-Orridge continued to cause controversy throughout their life.

Sexual and religious transgression has also featured prominently in mainstream popular music. Artists including Madonna and Prince provoked disputes over explicit representations of sexuality; the Catholic imagery in the video for Madonna's Like a Prayer led to condemnation from the Vatican, while Prince's Darling Nikki led to the formation of the Parents Music Resource Center (PMRC) and their Parental Advisory stickers after Tipper Gore was shocked by the song. Marilyn Manson deliberately employed anti-Christian and provocative imagery, describing himself as a "faggot anti-pope". Such controversies have repeatedly intersected with attempts to regulate popular music, including campaigns over explicit lyrics and the introduction of the Parental Advisory label in the United States during the 1980s.

Musical genres that also utilize transgressive themes or music include genres such as shock rock, punk rock, trap, grindcore, harsh noise, black metal and death metal, and various bands within the avant-garde rock or experimental rock genre. Since the late twentieth century, the term has also been applied to artists of musical genres including hardcore hip hop, gangsta rap, and horrorcore.

Eminem was a major subject of such controversy; his early works, most notably The Slim Shady LP (1999) and The Marshall Mathers LP (2000), were subjects of backlash surrounding their violent lyricism. Another major figure of criticism was rapper Tyler, the Creator: backlash to his horrorcore-influenced debut studio album, Goblin, subsequently led to cancelled concerts in New Zealand and the UK.

== See also ==
- Anti-art
- Artistic scandal
- Black comedy
- Cinema of Transgression
- Extreme cinema
- Exploitation film
- New French Extremity
- New Gothic Art
- Shock art
- Subvertising
- Torture porn
- Transgressive fiction
- Culture jamming
- Recuperation
