= Blood Cross =

Photograph by Andres Serrano

- Artist: Andres Serrano
- Year: 1985
- Medium: Photograph
- Movement: Postmodernism
- Subject: Plexiglass cross filled with cow's blood

Blood Cross is one of American photographer Andres Serrano's early religious-themed postmodernist images, released in 1985, two years before the controversial Piss Christ was debuted. This image depicted a plexiglass cross filled with cow's blood; the cross leaked slightly making it appear as though it was bleeding. It was exhibited along with Milk, Blood as part of Serrano's Fluids series.

In 1999, a print of Blood Cross fetched £17,825 at auction, considerably higher than the original estimate of £5,000–8,000.
