= Barbara DeGenevieve =

American interdisciplinary artist (1947–2014)

- Born: May 21, 1947; Wilkes-Barre, Pennsylvania, United States
- Died: August 4, 2014 (aged 67); Chicago, Illinois, United States
- Education: University of New Mexico
- Known for: Photography, video, and performance art
- Notable work: The Panhandler Project,
- Website: cargocollective.com/degenevieve

Barbara DeGenevieve (1947–2014) was an American interdisciplinary artist who worked in photography, video, and performance. She lectured on her work and on subjects including human sexuality, gender, transsexuality, censorship, ethics, and pornography. Her writing on these subjects have been published in art, photographic, and scholarly journals. She died of cervical cancer on August 9, 2014.

== Early life ==
DeGenevieve was born on May 21, 1947. She received a bachelors degree from Wilkes College in Pennsylvania in 1969. After that she got her masters degree from Southern Connecticut State University. After graduating she moved to Bridgeport, Connecticut, and while teaching disadvantaged children DeGenevieve discovered her love for photography. DeGenevieve studied photography at the University of New Mexico, receiving her MFA in 1980, and began teaching at the University of Illinois at Urbana-Champaign immediately following. She taught at San Jose State University, the San Francisco Art Institute, and the California College of Art before joining the faculty at the School of the Art Institute of Chicago in 1994. DeGenevieve was a professor and chair of the Department of Photography at the School of the Art Institute.

== Career ==
DeGenevieve's art explored the connections among dominance, power, and sex, including their inverse relationships. This led DeGenevieve into controversy, particularly during the National Endowment for the Arts funding scandals of the early 1990s, when she, Andres Serrano, and Merry Alpern were stripped of their grants from the NEA in 1994.

DeGenevieve established an interdisciplinary and new media arts program at SAIC that instructed students on constructing sexually graphic artworks. She spoke at conferences about her students' work, some of which existed in legal gray areas. In 2010 at the College Art Association she noted:<blockquoteArtists like myself and these students who do work that straddles some dangerous lines, such as the possibility of having the work considered obscene and therefore illegal, need to realize that the idea of free speech does not extend to sexual images. Although anathema to any artist, there is a self-monitoring (if not a self-censorship) that now occurs, and must occur to some extent in order for artists to protect themselves from the vagaries of the “fuzzy logic” employed in the interpretation of lens-derived imagery that is sexual in nature. DeGenevieve's works "showed everyone the rowdy, the provocative. How art should get in your face, really startle you. You should gasp."

DeGenevieve won awards from the National Endowment for the Arts (Visual Artist Fellowship); Art Matters Foundation Fellowship; and the Illinois Arts Council. Her critical and artistic works have been published in Exposure, SF Camerawork Magazine, and P-Form. Ezell Gallery, Chicago, represents her photographic work.

DeGenevieve was a professor and chair of the Department of Photography at the School of the Art Institute (SAIC).

DeGenevieve was most known for teaching a class titled "body language" which was known as the porn class to students. In this class student were asked to make and edit their own porn. This class was cancelled after one year which caused uproar in the community, petitions were signed to get the class reinstated; however that never happened.

=== The Panhandler Project ===
DeGenevieve completed a project from July 2004 to August 2006 in the city of Chicago. DeGenevieve would find her subjects on the streets and discuss with them if they were willing to be photographed nude for 100 dollars, food and a hotel room for the night. In this photo series she asked five different panhandlers to pose naked in a hotel room. This is a photo series accompanied with video documentation of the process of the photography.

According to DeGenevieve, she was an advocate for challenging “Political Incorrectness” which was one of her intentions with this project. Her work was intended to facilitate discourse to explore why an image or idea has the power to shock others. The Panhandler Project invited the curiosity of political incorrectness to be explored. She knew the project was going to be controversial and so she twisted some of the traditional binaries like gender and class to open up a space for a dialogue.

At the SAIC gallery showcasing her work in 2024, a symposium was held for the panhandler project titled, “The Panhandler Project and Interclass Contact”. This symposium allowed for students of the School of the Art Institute of Chicago to give their thoughts on the photo and video series.

== Selected works ==
- The Boys in Albuquerque (1978–1979)
- True Life Novelettes (1979–1982)
- Large Scale (1981–1985)
- Cliche Verres (1985–1992)
- Large Scale Stretched Fabric & Macaroni (1991–1995)
- Porn Poetry (1996–1997)
- Steven X and Barbara C (1999–2000) This is a video project that is made up of two monologues from two heads that in turn tell the story of a sexual encounter between a 40 year old man and a 12 year old girl in a park . The woman head in the video recounts a sexual deed that she initiated, while the male head recounts an act of pedophilia. While one of the heads talks the other is in freeze-frame. The viewer is tasked to consider which one is more corrupt and also brought to question the sexual agency of adolescent girls.
- The Panhandler Project (2004–2006)
- Desperado (2004–2006)This is a “Pseudo-documentary” about a relationship that DeGenevieve had with a former Louisiana truck driver. Which shows how the truck driver, Daryl, seduces DeGenevieve. It cuts between her being interviewed and the raw footage she took for the duration of their relationship. This short deals with themes of exploitation, like The Panhandler Project.

== Selected exhibitions ==
- In Your Face: Barbara DeGenevieve, Artist & Educator. SAIC Galleries, Chicago, IL (13 September – 7 December 2024)
- Barbara DeGenevieve: Medusa's Cave. Iceberg Projects, Chicago (12 September – 10 October 2015)
- INTI Terry Adkins, Barbara DeGenevieve, Rochelle Feinstein, Maren Hassinger, Clifford Owens, William Pope.L, Martha Rosler. OnStellarRays, NY (26 June – 29 July 2011) Group Exhibit.
- Kissy-Kissy. Dean Jensen Gallery, Milwaukee, WI (15 September – 13 October 2007) Works exhibited: From The Panhandlers Project (2004–2006)
- Objectifying the Abject: Exploitation, Political (In)Correctness and Ethical Dilemmas. Gallery 400 at University of Illinois at Chicago (7–25 February 2006) Work exhibited: Dee, 2005, Gordon, 2004, Hank, 2004, Leon, 2004, Mike, 2005, The Panhandler Project, 2005
- I Smell Sex. Visual AIDS, NY curated by Barbara DeGenevieve (October 2001)
- Face Forward Self Portraiture in Contemporary Art. John Michael Kohler Arts Center (28 May – 27 August 1995) Work exhibited: ASK ME ANYTHING, I HAVE NOTHING TO HIDE (1995)
- Barbara DeGenevieve: My Words in Your Mouth. Ezell/Gallery 954, Chicago (3–31 March 1995)

== Selected essays ==
- Degenevieve, Barbara (March 2007). "Censorship in the US or fear and loathing of the arts". Social Identities: Journal for the Study of Race, Nation and Culture. 13 (2): 159–173. doi:10.1080/13504630701235549. S2CID 143738504.
- Degenevieve, Barbara (January 2014). "The emergence of non-standard bodies and sexualities". Porn Studies. 1 (1–2): 193–196. doi:10.1080/23268743.2014.888253.
