= Merry Alpern =

American photographer

Merry Alpern (born 1955 in New York City) is an American photographer whose work has been shown in museums and exhibitions around the country including the Whitney Museum of American Art, San Francisco Museum of Modern Art, Museum of Modern Art, National Museum of Women in the Arts, and The Museum of Fine Arts, Houston. Her most notable work is her 1993-94 series Dirty Windows, a controversial project in which she took photos of an illegal sex club through a bathroom window in Manhattan near Wall Street. In 1994, the National Endowment for the Arts rejected recommended photography fellowships to Alpern, as well as Barbara DeGenevieve and Andres Serrano. Merry Alpern became one of many artists assaulted by congressional conservatives trying to defund the National Endowment for the Arts because of this series. As a result, museums such as the Museum of Modern Art in New York and San Francisco rushed to exhibit the series. She later produced and exhibited another series called Shopping which included images from hidden video cameras, taken in department stores, malls, and fitting rooms between 1997-99.

== Early life and career ==
Alpern was born to a Jewish-American family. She was a sociology major when she dropped out of Grinnell College in 1977. She moved to New York City shortly after and worked as a printer in a commercial lab. She later worked for Rolling Stone magazine and as an editorial freelancer. A 1995 feature on her Dirty Windows project in American Photo magazine lists Time Warner, Barron's, and Investment Advisor among her commercial clients. In April 1995 she signed with Bonni Benrubi Gallery, and "more than 200 of her prints...sold at prices ranging from $500 to $2,500," despite the controversy arising from the NEA's advisory council rescinding the grant its peer panel awarded her. Since 2018 she is represented exclusively by Galerie Miranda, Paris.

== Dirty Windows, 1993-94 ==
Alpern discovered an illegal sex club through the window of a friend's Wall Street loft in 1993. She spent "several nights a week for nine months" photographing her view of the club using a telephoto lens. The club was eventually shut down, but while it was open, "nothing was ever done to create a semblance of privacy," allowing Alpern to create a large number of images. Alpern submitted prints to the NEA and was awarded a grant by a peer panel, which was subsequently rescinded by the NEA's advisory council. Upon the exhibition of Dirty Windows at Bonni Benrubi Gallery, New York Times critic Charles Hagen called the images "nowhere near as explicit as, say, any number of magazines on your corner newsstand," and questioned both the cancellation and the awarding of the NEA grant, given how "repetitive" the images were.

== Works ==
- A.J. and Jim Bob, 1987-88.
- Dirty Windows, 1993-94.
- Shopping, 1999.
