= Andres Serrano =

American photographer and artist (born 1950)

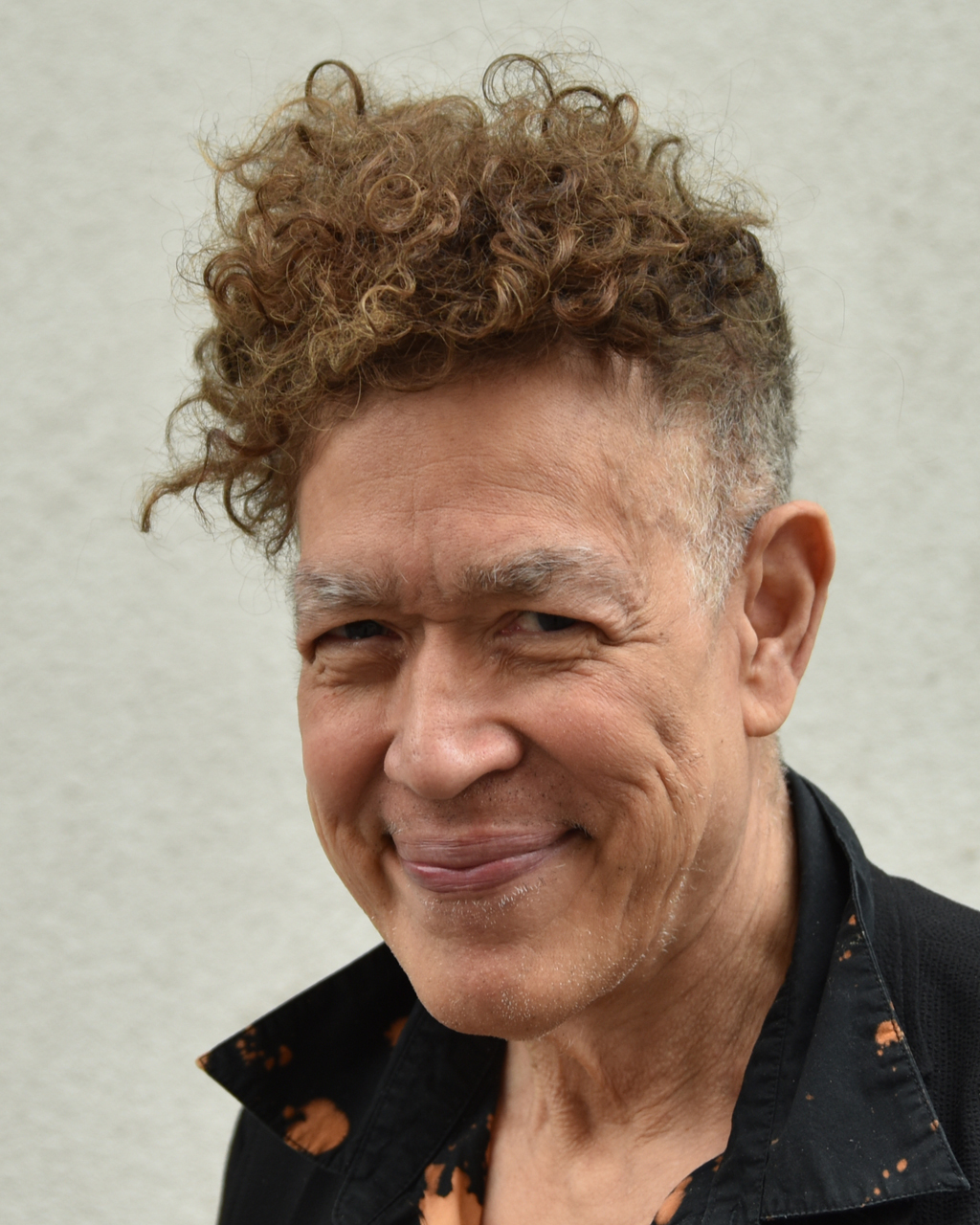
- Serrano in 2023
- Born: August 15, 1950 (age 76); New York City, U.S.
- Education: Brooklyn Museum Art School
- Known for: Photography
- Spouse(s): Julie Ault (m. 1980, div. 2005); Irina Movmyga (current)

Andres Serrano (born August 15, 1950) is an American photographer and artist. His work, often considered transgressive art, includes photos of corpses and uses feces and bodily fluids. His Piss Christ (1987) is an amber-tinged photograph of a crucifix submerged in a glass container of what was purported to be the artist's own urine. He also created the artwork for the albums Load and Reload by Metallica.

== Early life ==
Serrano was born in Williamsburg, Brooklyn, New York City on August 15, 1950 to a Honduran father and an Afro-Cuban mother who was born in Key West but raised in Cuba. His father left New York for Honduras while Serrano was young, and he was mostly raised by his mother, whom he "didn't like" and suffered from schizophrenia. Serrano was raised as a strict Roman Catholic, but left the Church after being confirmed. He dropped out of high school at 15, and attended the Brooklyn Museum Art School on scholarship from 1967 to 1969, where he studied sculpture and painting. After leaving art school, he took up photography for the first time. He then moved to the East Village, where he became a drug addict and dealer for much of the 1970s before quitting at 28.

== Career ==
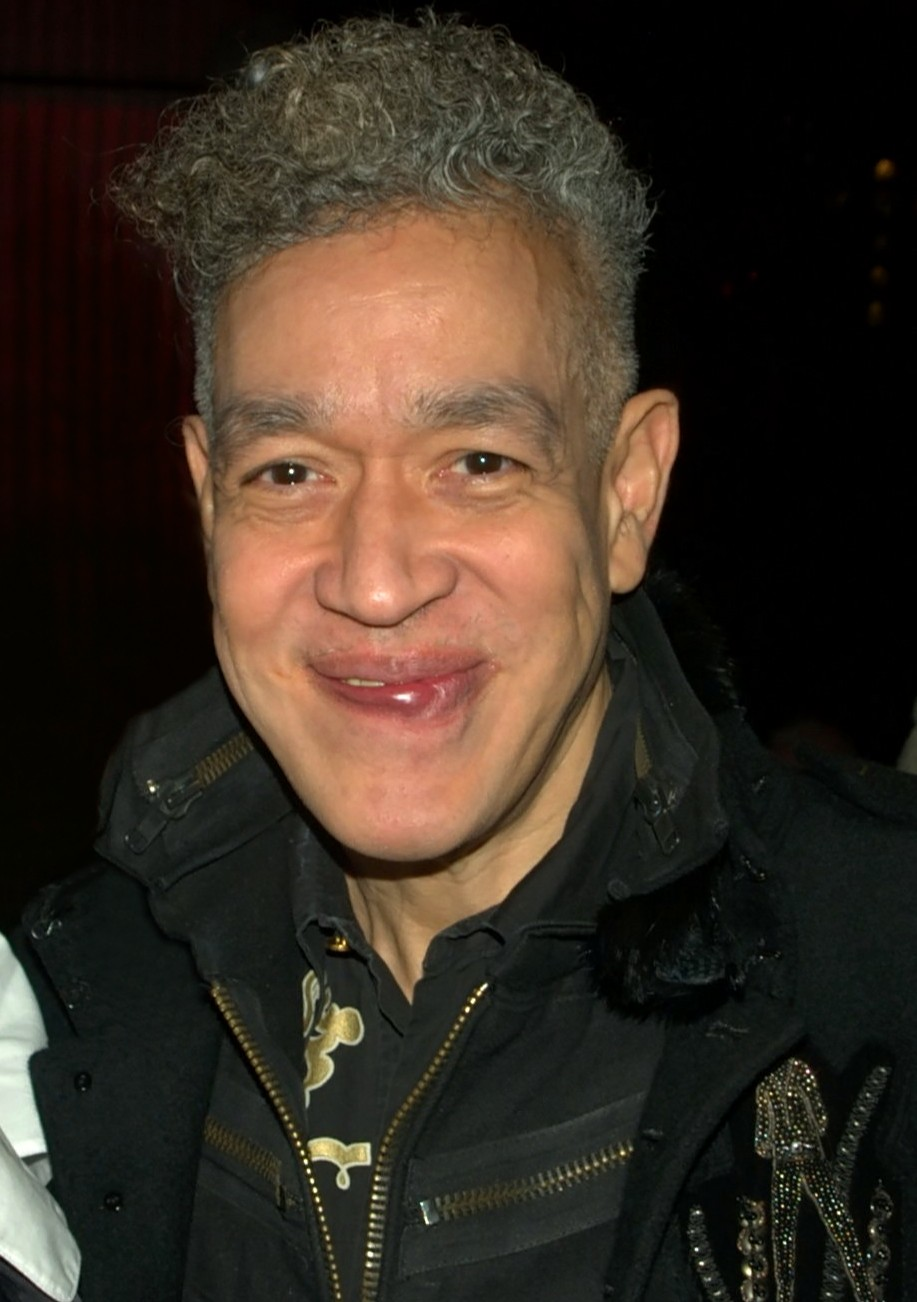
Serrano in 2010 at Michael Musto's Village Voice 25th Anniversary party

Serrano began making art again in 1980, when he met his first wife. He worked as an assistant art director at an advertising firm before exhibiting his first work in 1983. Photographer Alex Harsley put Serrano's work in his first New York City show at his Fourth Street Photo Gallery.

His work has been exhibited in diverse locations around the world including the Episcopal Cathedral of St. John the Divine in New York City, World without End (2001), and a retrospective at the Barbican Arts Centre in London, Body and Soul (2001).

His exhibitions have often inspired angry reactions. On October 5, 2007, his group of photographs called The History of Sex were on display and several were vandalized at an art gallery in Lund, Sweden by people who were believed to be part of a neo-Nazi group. On April 16, 2011, after two weeks of protests and a campaign of hate mail and abusive phone calls to an art gallery displaying his work, orchestrated by groups of French Catholic reactionaries, approximately a thousand people marched through the streets of Avignon, to protest outside the gallery. On April 17, 2011, two of his works, Piss Christ and The Church, were vandalized. The gallery director plans to reopen the museum with the damaged works on show "so people can see what barbarians can do".

Serrano usually makes large prints of about 20 by 30 inches (51 by 76 cm). He has shot an array of subject matter including portraits of Klansmen, morgue photos, and pictures of burn victims. He went into the New York City Subway with lights and photographic background paper to portray the bedraggled homeless, as well as producing some rather tender but sometimes decidedly kinky portraits of couples. One of these last shows what Adrian Searle of The Guardian described as "a young couple, she with a strap-on dildo, he with a mildly expectant expression."

Madonna and Child II, Cibachrome print by Andres Serrano, 1989, Corcoran Gallery of Art (Washington, D. C.)

Many of Serrano's pictures involve bodily fluids in some way—depicting, for example, blood (sometimes menstrual blood), semen (for example, Blood and Semen II (1990)) or human breast milk. Within this series are a number of works in which objects are submerged in bodily fluids. Among these is Piss Christ (1987), a photograph of a plastic crucifix submerged in a glass of the artist's own urine, which caused great controversy when first exhibited. The work was sold for $277,000 in 1999, which was far beyond the estimated $20,000 – $30,000. Serrano, alongside other artists such as Robert Mapplethorpe, Barbara Degenevieve, and Merry Alpern, became a figure whom Senator Jesse Helms, and Senator Alphonse D'Amato, as well as other cultural conservatives, attacked for producing offensive art while others, including The New York Times, defended him in the name of artistic freedom. (See the American "culture wars" of the 1990s).

Serrano's series Objects of Desire, from the early 1990s, features close-ups of firearms, photographed at the Slidell, Louisiana home of artist Blake Nelson Boyd. Included is a shot, against a glowing orange background, down the barrel of a loaded .45 revolver (belonging to Boyd's grandfather) that was used by Jonas Mekas for the cover of the April–May–June 2007 Anthology Film Archives catalog.

Critical reception of Serrano's work has been mixed. In a 1989 New York Times review, critic Michael Brenson responded to Serrano's series of Cibachrome photographs of iconic objects submerged in bodily fluids: "You cannot consider the content of Mr. Serrano's work without considering his attitude toward photography. It is the photograph that breaks through convention, that makes the search possible and that enables the artist to sort out what he likes and does not like in religion and art. It is the photograph that becomes the vessel of transformation and revelation. The photograph then becomes an icon that, for Mr. Serrano, replaces the false icons in his work. The photograph is clean and purified, the reliquary or shrine in which he clearly believes that the word about the body can be stored and spread." Reviewing later work in 2001, Guardian art critic Adrian Searle was not impressed: he found that Serrano's photos were "far more about being lurid than anything else... In the end, the show is all surface, and looking for hidden depths does no good." Continuing his use of biological matter, more recent work of Serrano's uses feces as a medium.

Serrano's work Blood and Semen III is used as the cover of heavy metal band Metallica's album Load (1996), while Piss and Blood is used on Reload (1997). The band's guitarist Kirk Hammett learned of Serrano's work after purchasing an art book of his titled Body and Soul from the San Francisco Museum of Modern Art. Serrano had known of Metallica but was unaware of their music. He appreciated the collaboration and believed it would help expand his audience. Serrano also directed a video for industrial metal group Godflesh, "Crush My Soul".

In 2008, Serrano's piece The Interpretation of Dreams (White Nigger) was selected to participate in The Renaissance Society's group exhibit, "Black Is, Black Ain't".

Serrano adopted the alter ego "Brutus Faust" to create the full-length album Vengeance Is Mine in July 2010. The album contains covers of classic songs from the 1960s, and original compositions including four songs written by Serrano's wife, Irina Movmyga, as well as one song co-written by Serrano, Thad DeBrock, and album producer Steve Messina of New York City–based band Blow Up Hollywood. Coinciding with the release of the album are the videos Goo Goo Gaga, Love Letters, and Bad Moon Rising. Goo Goo Gaga consists mostly of black-and-white footage from the 1940s, which makes parallels between the Depression and the present day, with the images of "Brutus" shot by Francesco Carrozzini. Love Letters is footage taken from cult director Joe Sarno's Flesh and Lace. Bad Moon Rising consists entirely of footage Serrano compiled from several short films by John Santerineross. All of these short films were edited by Vincent V.

In 2013, Serrano made a work of art called Sign of the Times by collecting 200 signs from homeless people in New York City, usually paying $20 for each sign. He described the work as "a testimony to the homeless men and women who roam the streets in search of food and shelter. It's also a chronicle of the times we live in." Over the course of several months, Serrano engaged with over 85 homeless individuals in Manhattan and photographed them for a series called Residents of New York, a site-specific public art exhibition on display from May 19 to June 15, 2014, at the West Fourth Street – Washington Square subway station, on LaGuardia Place (between West 3rd and Bleecker Streets), at Judson Memorial Church, and in phone booths and posters around the city. The installation was produced and developed by More Art, a nonprofit organization based in New York that is dedicated to the development of socially engaged public art projects. Serrano initially photographed homeless individuals in the city in 1990 for a series of studio-style portraits titled Nomads. In Residents of New York, he removed his signature studio elements, focusing instead on personal connectivity and interaction directly on the streets of New York City, where the homeless live.

== Personal life ==
In December 1980, Serrano married artist Julie Ault. They separated in 1990 and divorced in 2005. As of 2012, he was married to Irina Movmyga. Serrano has said that he is a Christian.

His Greenwich Village co-op is decorated with a substantial collection of early modern religious art and other religious ephemera, including pews. He also collects a variety of other items, including Donald Trump memorabilia and racist merchandise, occasionally incorporating these into his exhibitions.

=== Association with Jeffrey Epstein ===
Serrano first came into contact with Jeffrey Epstein in 1995, after Epstein purchased a 16th-century Madonna from the collection of deceased collector Charles Dent. The Madonna was one of a pair of statues, the other being a statue of John the Baptist. Serrano intended to purchase both statues prior to Epstein's purchase of the Madonna, but only succeeded in purchasing the statue of John. He subsequently attempted to buy the statue from Epstein in a series of meetings at Epstein's Manhattan town house. After sporadic contact with Epstein over the next decades, Epstein offered to trade the Madonna in exchange for a portrait of him by Serrano in 2018. Serrano obliged, receiving the Madonna and shooting Epstein's portrait in April 2019, briefly before Epstein's final arrest and death.

The November 2025 Epstein files release included an email from Serrano to Epstein from October 2016, where Serrano expressed disgust at the public outrage toward Donald Trump in the wake of the Access Hollywood tape, and described contemplating giving Trump his "sympathy vote". Serrano has defended his relationship with Epstein and denied wrongdoing.

== Exhibitions ==
- 2015: Redemption, Fotografiska Stockholm
- 2020: Infamous, Fotografiska New York
- 2020: Infamous, NeueHouse Hollywood
- 2022: Infamous, Fotografiska Stockholm
- 2023: Infamous, Fotografiska Tallinn
- 2023: Infamous, DOX Centre for Contemporary Art, Prague in 2023
- 2024: Infamous, Oslo Negativ
- 2026: Photography in Power (group exhibition), Fotografiska Tallinn, Estonia

== See also ==
- Banksy
- Blood Cross
- Cinema of Transgression
- New French Extremity
- Nick Zedd
- Shock art
