= Amen or The Pederasty =

Performance art by Abel Azcona

- Artist: Abel Azcona
- Year: 2015
- Type: Performance art
- Location: Pamplona, Madrid

Amen, more commonly known as The Pederasty ("La pederastia" in Spanish), is a conceptual, critical and process artwork by Abel Azcona. Over several months, Azcona (who had received a Catholic education from the age of seven following his adoption) attended Eucharists in churches and parishes that were linked to his childhood. At each Eucharist, he kept the communion wafer rather than eating it. He thus gathered two hundred and forty-two wafers, the number of cases of pederasty reported in the north of Spain during the decade before that. He arranged the wafers into a work that spelled out the word Pederasty. It was first exhibited at a gallery in central Madrid in the summer of 2015.

== Exhibition ==
At the end of 2015, a section of the work by Abel Azcona was selected to be part of a retrospective exhibition of the artist's works inside the city of Pamplona's Monument to the Fallen in the Spanish Civil War. The work was located on the altar of the old monument, which was formerly the cathedral of Pamplona, but at the time of Azconas' show, it was desacralized. Along with Amen, Azcona's other critical works about child abuse such as The Shadow were displayed. In The Shadow, he denounced cases of child abuse in a piece in which the survivors are the protagonists. In the work, Azcona presented more than two hundred actual cases of pedophilia in museums and galleries in various cities in Spain. At each show, Azcona gave a live performance from a wooden swing of the experiences of the survivors. A swing was also installed inside the Monument to the Fallen of Pamplona.

== Controversy ==
The day after the inauguration of the exhibition, multiple demonstrations and demands for its closure occurred. The Catholic Church called it the greatest offense to Christian belief on numerous occasions. Azcona documented all these situations of confrontation and included them in the exhibitions of the work. The artist endured more than five years of judicial proceedings for complaints about the work at many different courts and judicial entities.

Abel Azcona's work denounces child abuse and has been persecuted and denounced for being critical of the Church in works such as Amen or The Pederasty. This last one was sued three times before the Superior Court of Justice of Navarra for three crimes and alleged desecration and blasphemy. The first one was by the Archbishopric of Pamplona and Tudela, who are representatives of the Catholic Church in the north of Spain. The second one, by the Delegation of the Government in Navarra, controlled by the Popular Party at the time, and the third one was by The Asociación Española de Abogados Cristianos (Spanish Association of Christian Lawyers), who also made criminal complaints against Azcona. The lawsuits were won by Azcona, however the group took the complaint to the Supreme Court. Whilst awaiting the case being heard by the Supreme Court, the Association of Christian Lawyers, in this instance acting alone, started an action against Spain in the European Court of Human Rights in Strasbourg for not condemning Azcona, and according to them, to protect him. Each time the work was shown, the complaint was re-formulated, so Azcona was cited in the Court of Justice of Palma de Mallorca and the High Court of Justice of Catalonia in Barcelona. After five years of judicial proceedings for critical works against the Catholic Church and more specifically, with pedophilia, Azcona declared his "disobedience" in relation to charges, and the complainants included obstruction of justice in their complaints.

When the High Court of Justice of Catalonia issued a judicial arrest warrant in 2019 after Azcona failed to appear before the court for the third time, Azcona went into exile and settled in Lisbon, Portugal. This has not prevented him from opening new exhibitions in the Spain and publishing critical works. He defends his artistic ideology and his political ideas, which are supported by certain sectors of the Spanish left-wing. Conversely, his works are seen as desecrations and sacrileges by the most conservative sector of Spanish and Latin American society.

== Collection ==
The work has been exhibited in various museums in Berga, Mallorca, Murcia, Madrid and Lleida, cities of Spain. The latest exhibition in Lleida was presented by art collector Tatxo Benet, who added it to his Censored Art Collection. It is displayed at the Museu de l'Art Prohibit in Barcelona.

== Bibliography ==
- Group FIDEX, Figures of excess and body policies (2018). Technical-conceptual atlas of the Fidex research group: Micropolitics in contemporary research in Fine Arts (in Spanish). Universitas Miguel Hernández. ISBN 978-8416024711.
- Moya Gómez, Carlos (2016). A vision of gender through performance in today's Spain (PDF) (in Spanish). Universitat Pompeu Fabra.
- Silva Gómez, Norma Ángelica (2018). Abel Azcona: Of empathy as (im) possibility (in Spanish). Colegio de Saberes de México.
- Muñoz Clemente, Carolina (2016). El arte contemporáneo para la comprensión crítica del Centro Comercial (PDF) (in Spanish). University Complutense of Madrid.
