= Abel Azcona =

Spanish artist

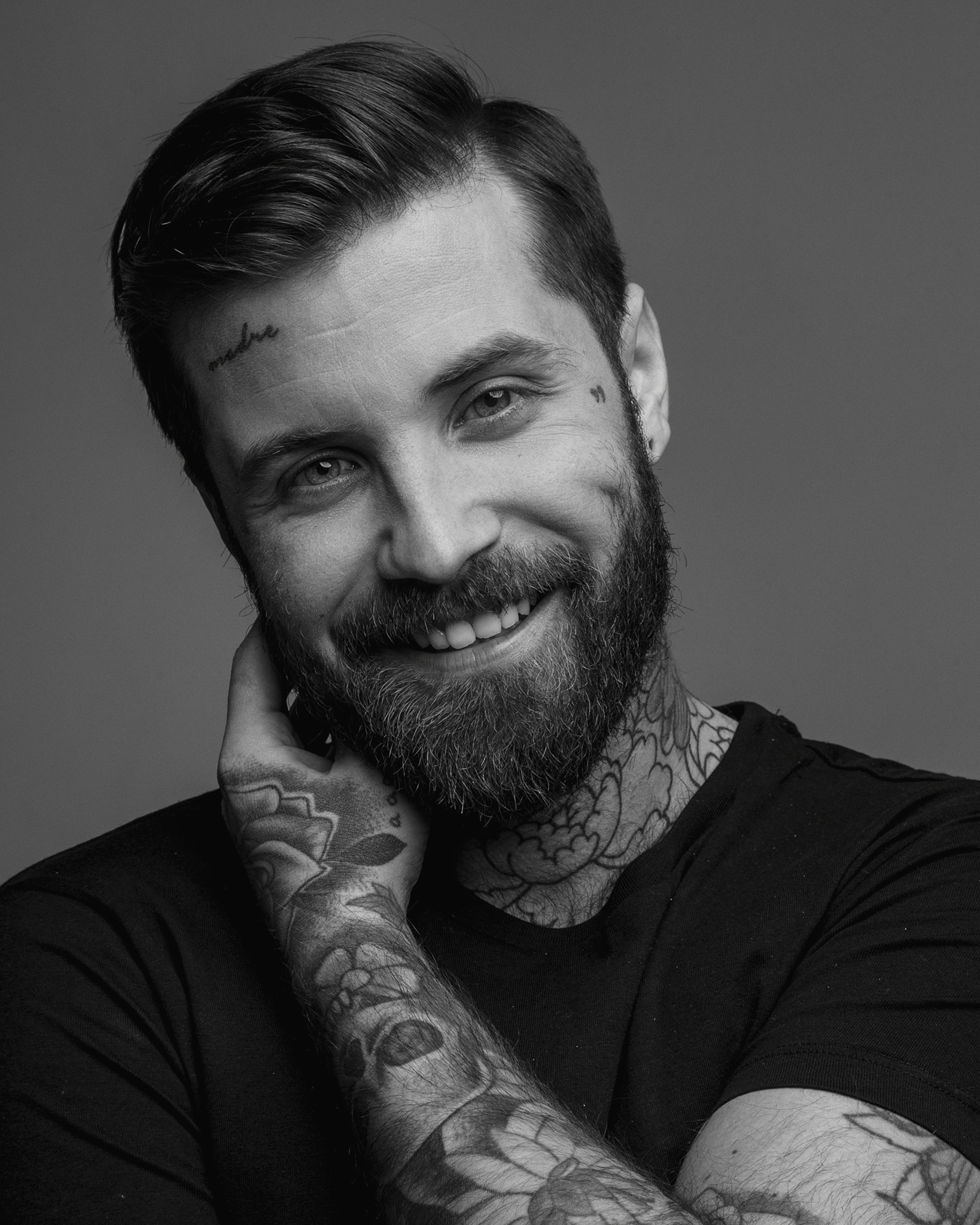
- Abel Azcona
- Born: Abel Luján Gutierrez; 1 April 1988 (age 38); Madrid, Spain
- Known for: Performance Art, Process Art, Body Art
- Notable work: Empathy and Prostitution (2013); Amen or The Pederasty (2015); The Fathers (2016); The Death of The Artist (2018)
- Movement: Conceptual art, Performance Art, Process Art
- Website: abelazcona.art

Abel Azcona Marcos (born 1 April 1988) is a Spanish artist, specializing in performance art. His work includes installations, sculptures, and video art. He is known as the "enfant terrible" of Spanish contemporary art. His first works dealt with personal identity, violence and the limits of pain; his later works are of a more critical, political and social nature.

Azcona's works have been exhibited at the Venetian Arsenal, the Contemporary Art Center in Málaga, the Bogotá Museum of Modern Art, the Houston Art League, the Leslie-Lohman Museum of Art in New York and the Círculo de Bellas Artes in Madrid. His work has also been exhibited at the Asian Art Biennale in Dhaka and Taipei, the Lyon Biennale, the Miami International Performance Festival and the Bangladesh Live Art Biennale. The Bogotá Museum of Contemporary Art dedicated a retrospective exhibition to him in 2014.

== Early life ==
Abel Azcona was born on 1 April 1988, as the result of an unwanted pregnancy, in the Montesa Clinic in Madrid, an institution that was run by a religious community. It was geared towards people at risk of social exclusion and homelessness. His father's identity is unknown, and his mother, a drug user and prostitute called Victoria Luján Gutiérrez, abandoned him at the clinic a few days after his birth. The nuns gave the newborn baby to a man who knew his mother and who insisted he was the father, even though he met her when she was already pregnant and was her partner only sporadically. Azcona was then raised in the city of Pamplona with this man, who continuously went in and out of prison, and his family, which was unstructured and linked to drug trafficking and delinquency.

The first four years of Azcona's life were characterised by mistreatment, abuse and abandonment, caused by different members within his family environment, and the fact he passed through various residences, which caused several concerns about custody from public institutions of social protection. Due to this precarious situation, his birth was not registered until the age of four, in 1992, when Social Welfare intervened.

The child is in a situation of complete abandonment, with visible signs of abuse, neglect and malnutrition, and testimonies by neighbours [...] confirm that the child occasionally finds himself alone for weeks in the house, which does not fulfill minimum habitability conditions.

— Social Welfare of the Government of Navarre File on Azcona, Published in full in Abel Azcona 1988–2018.

A young Catholic woman from Navarre was introduced to a newborn Azcona when she met the man who brought newborn Azcona from the Montesa clinic in Madrid to Pamplona in prison, where she volunteered; he still falsely presented himself as Azcona's biological father. She coordinated a Catholic group in the Saint Vincent of Paúl parish and was a volunteer with Caritas Internationalis. This meeting in the penitentiary center led to the baptism of Azcona when he was uncommonly old, in a parish located in front of the prison, requested by the woman, who became his godmother. She was the eldest daughter of a conservative Navarrese family (with three daughters); the family started taking Azcona in when he was four years old – typically over short periods of time and weekends – after the man came out of prison and they realised how poor Azcona's situation was. They informally cared for him until the age of six, when they requested to foster him on a more permanent basis. When he was six, the situation with the man's family got worse and custody was withdrawn. An adoption request began to be processed, and he was officially adopted by the eldest daughter at the age of seven. The family also intervened to allow him to be accepted into the Catholic schools the daughters had attended. However, he had problems adapting to the family and to the school, which manifested in instances of theft and violence at the school until he was expelled at the age of thirteen.

== Name ==
Throughout his life, Abel Azcona has been officially known by various names: Abel Luján Gutiérrez, Abel David Lebrijo González, Abel David Azcona Marcos, David Azcona Marcos, and Abel David Azcona Ema. Azcona's biological mother chose the name Abel and, when registering him at the Montesa Clinic as her own, he was first named Abel Luján Gutiérrez, using both her surnames. The child was not registered in the Civil Registry until he was four years of age and, as he had been abandoned by his mother, her partner took care of the child and registered him as Abel David Lebrijo González, using his surnames; these are the first surnames that appear legally. From then on, in different records and documents, such as at school, the second surname is shown as Raposo, that of the man's new partner. At the age of seven he was adopted and became known as Abel David Azcona Ema, taking on the surnames of his adoptive mother. The adoptive family refused to use the name Abel, since it implied a connection to the biological mother, so they called him David. At fifteen years of age, Azcona was adopted by the husband of his adoptive mother, becoming Abel David Marcos Azcona (taking his surname); after a family process to invert the surnames was approved, 'Azcona' returned as the first surname, and he legally became Abel David Azcona Marcos. At the age of twenty he decided to remove the name David, as he no longer had a relationship with his adoptive family, and started using Abel again, as a tribute to his biological mother and as a response to the restrictions he felt with the other name.

== Early works ==
Azcona's first performances were created in the streets of Pamplona in 2005 when he was a student in the Pamplona School of Art. They all had a critical spirit and were an objective of denunciation. During these early years, Azcona turned his traumatic experiences into artistic works. In 2011 and 2012 his artworks started gaining greater relevance, but in 2012 he was admitted to two psychiatric clinics, one in Barcelona and the other in Pamplona, where he stayed for some time as he had deep mental issues and had made a serious suicide attempt. When he came out of the centres, he made a performance demonstration, totally naked and sitting on a chair, to interrupt traffic on one of the main streets of Pamplona. Since this, he has carried out some works in the streets periodically, all of them with the same critical spirit and intent to denounce, with themes such as abandonment, violence, identity and sexuality. He has been detained on various occasions for these.

Azcona's adoption was characterised by complicated situations and a lack of attachment to the family, until he abandoned it definitively when he was eighteen. He then returned to Madrid, living in poverty on the streets for almost two years. During this time he occasionally committed crime and practised prostitution, but also carried out artistic works in the streets of Madrid.

"Es evidente que acabar en las calles de Madrid, ciudad donde mi madre me abandonó, navegando en un entorno sometido a la prostitución y la drogodependencia, los dos únicos aspectos que había conocido de ella, no fue resultado de la casualidad. Por primera vez, sentí que volvía de forma regresiva a ser quien había sido: el niño nacido de una mujer avasallada por la heroína y el abuso del hombre y el mercado, habitando y errando por las calles de la ciudad que accidentalmente le dio la vida."

It is obvious that ending in the streets of Madrid, city where my mother abandoned me, navigating through an environment of prostitution and drug abuse, the only two aspects that I had known of her, was not the result of chance. For the first time, I felt like I went back to who I used to be: the kid born from a woman dominated by heroin and the abuse of men and the market, inhabiting and roaming the streets of the city in which she accidentally gave birth to me.

— Abel Azcona, The Little Buds 2019

== Artistic works ==
=== Empathy and Prostitution ===
Empathy and Prostitution is a conceptual and performative work of critical and biographical content. It was created and first performed in the Santa Fe Gallery, Bogotá, in February 2013. The work had a second performance at the Factoría de Arte y Desarrollo, an artistic space in Madrid, in November 2013, and there was a third performance at the Houston International Performance Biennial, in February 2014. Azcona was inspired by his biological mother, a prostitute, and sought to empathise with her and with the moment of his own conception. Azcona offered himself naked to the galleries' visitors on a bed with white sheets, so that they could exchange intimacy or have sexual relations with him. Photographs, drawings and documentation of the work were part of the Art Is Hope charity exhibitions in Paris and Pride in New York. The depictions of the performance piece have been exhibited in museums such as the Palais de Tokyo and the Perrotin Gallery, and also displayed at the Piasa auction house in Paris. The New York exhibition and auction at Paddle8 promoted sexual diversity and featured artists such as Haring, Bourgeois, Goldin, Mapplethorpe, Warhol, and Azcona himself. In 2017 there were also exhibitions in museums such as the Tulla Center in the Albanian capital Tirana. The Juan Gallery in Madrid, which specializes in performance art, included this work in a retrospective exhibition, The Extinction of Desire, which focused on works with sexual themes.

=== Someone Else ===
Someone Else is a conceptual and performative work of critical and biographical content. Following on with the same concepts as Empathy and Prostitution, the inaugural 2014 Queer New York Arts Festival was opened with a work by Azcona entitled Someone Else. In this, physical or even sexual contact with the artist was required to enter the venue of the event, which was held at Grace Exhibition Space and the Leslie-Lohman Museum of Art in New York City. This work was chosen by critic Hrag Vartanian as one of the top ten of the year in New York City.

=== The War ===
The War is a conceptual and performative work of critical and biographical content. In 2016, Azcona activated his last sex-themed piece in this series, La Guerra (The War), which premiered at the Intramurs Festival in Valencia, Spain, which was again inspired by prostitution, criticism and sexuality. On this occasion, Azcona offered his naked body, anesthetized by the use of narcotics, so that the visitors could use it freely.

=== The Streets ===
The Streets (La Calle; "the sexual exchange") is a conceptual and performative work of critical and biographical content. At the end of 2014 and the early part of 2015, Azcona performed the work as a process where he prostitutes himself on the streets. In it, he explored a change towards becoming the figure of his mother, taking hormones and engaging in prostitution. It began in the Santa Fe neighborhood of Bogotá, with the process continuing in the cities of Madrid and Mexico City. The performance emerged, as with the rest of his sex-themed works, as an exercise in empathy with his own biological mother. It was also a social critique, where the artist explored the limits of his body by repeating patterns of sexual abuse, things which occurred in his own childhood and in the life of his mother.

=== The Shame ===
Developed along the West Bank Wall in 2018, in The Shame Azcona installed original fragments of the Berlin Wall along the Israeli wall in the West Bank, which forms part of the barrier built throughout Israel to separate the Palestinian lands. Azcona made a metaphorical critique by merging both walls in the work. The actual installation, as if it were a piece of land art, currently remains along the wall, and has been exhibited in different countries through photographic and video art. The work has been criticized and denounced by Israel.

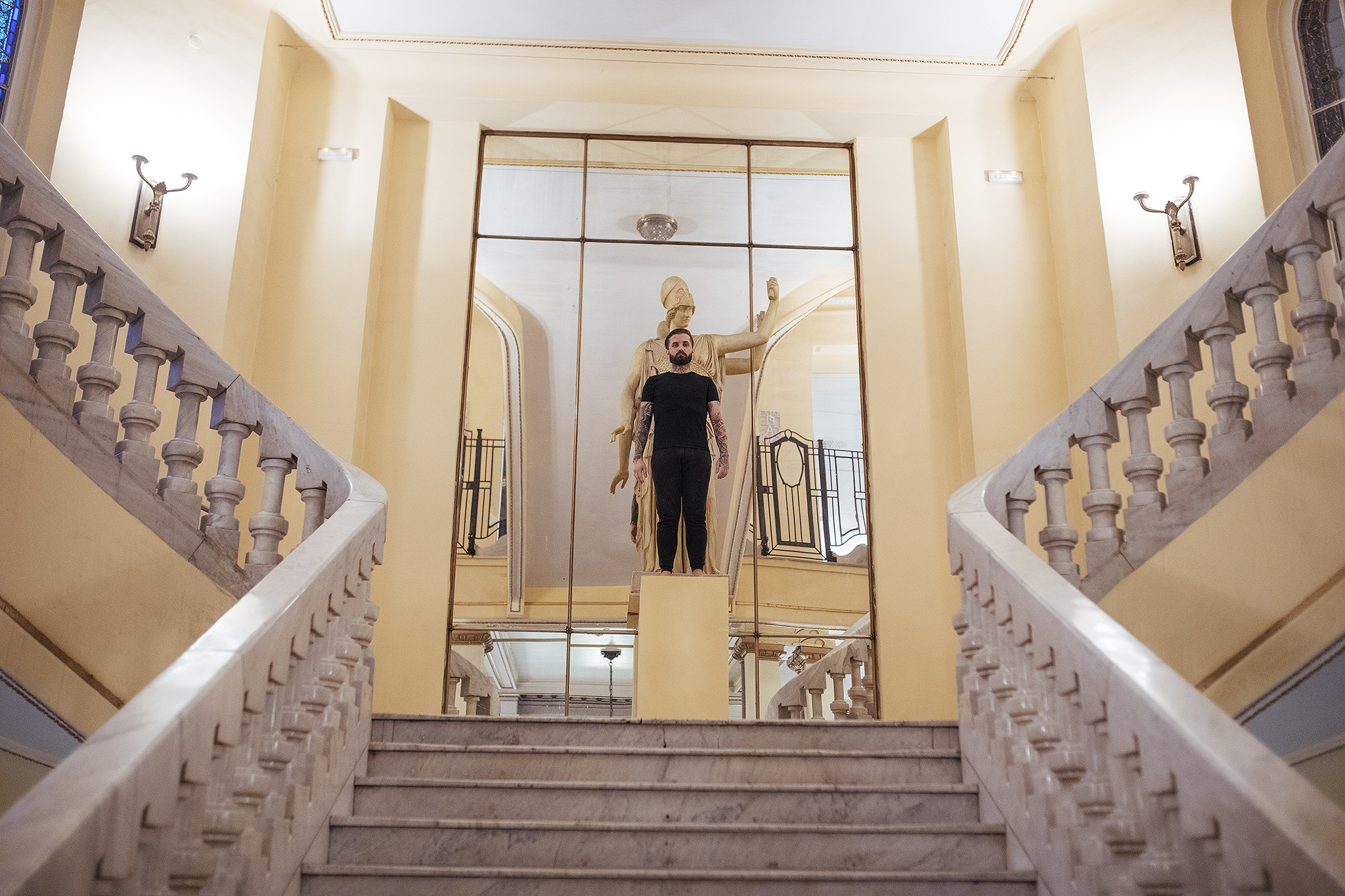
Azcona during The Death of Artist at Círculo de Bellas Artes de Madrid

=== The Death of The Artist ===
The Death of the Artist was both a continuation of his earlier works and closure of the series, being performed in 2018 in the lobby of the Círculo de Bellas Artes in Madrid. His previous works had caused Azcona to receive threats, as well as be the subject of persecution and acts of violence. Azcona formally invited by letter the organisations, groups, and entities that had threatened his life to the installation, where a loaded gun was offered and Azcona stood exposed on a raised platform. In addition, the Círculo de Bellas Artes presented a complete reading of a manifesto titled The artist's presumption as a radical and disobedient subject, both in life and in death.

=== Amen or The Pederasty ===
Although named Amen by Azcona himself, the work is more commonly known as The Pederasty (“La pederastia” in Spanish). Over a period of several months in 2015, Azcona attended Eucharists in churches and parishes that were linked to his own childhood. Azcona kept the consecrated hosts given to the attendees of the communion from the churches, gathering 242 hosts; this was the number of cases of pederasty reported in the north of Spain during the previous decade. With the hosts, he made a work in which the word Pederastia (Pederasty in English) could be read. The work was first exhibited in Madrid in the summer of 2015.

At the end of 2015, a section of the work was selected to be part of a retrospective exhibition of Azcona's works inside the city of Pamplona's Monument to the Fallen of the Spanish Civil War. The work was located on the altar of the old monument, which was formerly the cathedral of Pamplona; at the time of the show, it had already been desacralized. The day after the inauguration of the exhibition, multiple demonstrations and demands for its closure occurred. On multiple occasions, the Catholic Church called the work a great offense to Christian belief. Azcona documented all the situations of confrontation and included them in other exhibitions of the work. He also endured more than five years of judicial proceedings for various complaints about the work at different courts and judicial entities. The work has been exhibited in museums in Berga, Mallorca, Murcia, Madrid and Lleida. The latest exhibition in Lleida was presented in Tatxo Benet's collection, which included works by Azcona, Ai Weiwei, Francisco de Goya, Robert Mapplethorpe and Andres Serrano.

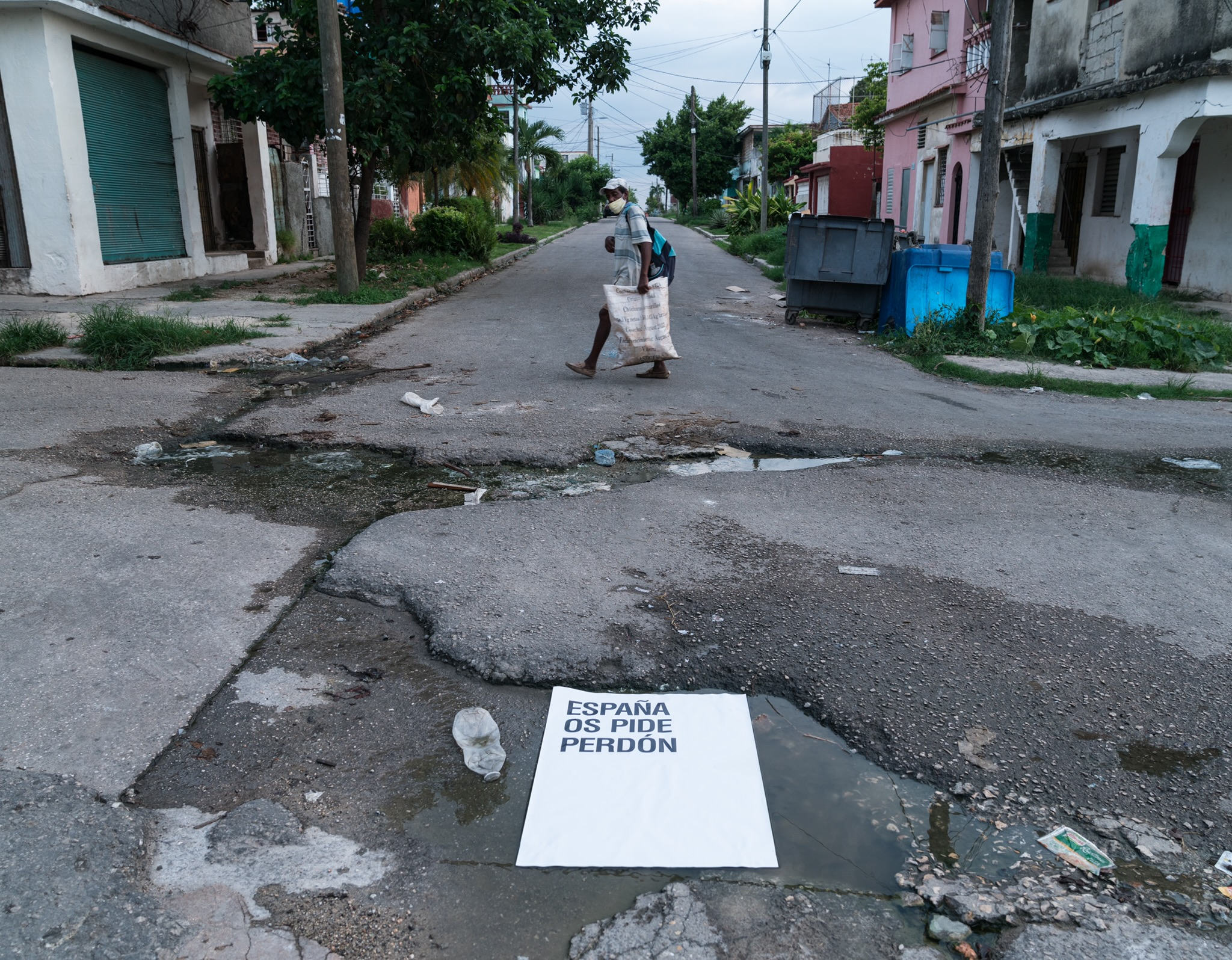
Spain Asks for Forgiveness by Azcona in La Habana

=== Spain Asks for Forgiveness ===
Spain Asks for Forgiveness is a conceptual and performative work of critical and anti-colonial. Created and started in Bogotá in November 2018 through a conference and a live performance by Azcona at the museum of contemporary art of Bogotá. In November 2018, through a conference and live performance by artist Abel Azcona in the Bogotá Contemporary Art Museum the work Spain Asks for Forgiveness (España os Pide Perdón in Spanish) began, a piece of critical and anticolonialist content. In the first performance, Azcona read a ninety-two-page text for more than four hours. In the reading, the quoted phrase Spain Asks for Forgiveness was repeated continuously. Two months later, Azcona was invited to present his work in Mexico City in the Mexico City Museum, where he installed a sailcloth with the same sentence on it. Just a few days later the president of Mexico Andrés Manuel López Obrador during a press conference demanded publicly an apology from Spain. Since then until mid 2020, the work has been shown in diverse ways and has achieved to become a collective movement. In May 2020 the Bogotá Contemporary Art Museum painted its facade with the installation's motto España os pide perdón for two months in the centre of the city of Bogotá. Other cities such as Havana, Cuba; Lima, Peru; Caracas, Venezuela; Panama City, Panama; Tegucigalpa, Honduras or Quito, Ecuador have been protagonists of the piece through paintings, sailcloths, posters or demonstrations and collective acts continuing the work as a collective protest.

=== The Shadow ===
The Shadow is a conceptual work consisting of performance art, an installation, and photography, as a denunciation of dozens of child abuse cases. In the piece Azcona denounces child abuse by presenting the survivors as the protagonists. In the work, Azcona presented more than two hundred actual cases of pedophilia in museums and galleries in various cities in Spain. At each show, Azcona gave a live performance, from a wooden swing, of the experiences of the survivors.

=== Eating a Koran ===
Eating a Koran was first presented in October 2012 in the exhibition space of the College of Performing Arts of the University of the Arts in Berlin. Azcona began a series of works of a performative nature, which each criticise religious entities. In the works, Azcona used representative icons of various religions, such as the Koran, the Bible, the Torah and other objects of a sacred character. In the most controversial of them, Azcona performed for nine hours ingesting the pages of a copy of the Koran. This work provoked the most repercussions of any of the series, and the artist was threatened for the piece. The work was performed again in the Krudttønden, Copenhagen. From there, Azcona founded an art collection together with other artists such as Lars Vilks and Bjørn Nørgaard, who had been persecuted and threatened for their creations. With the collective of himself, Vilks, Nørgaard, the writer Salman Rushdie and the cartoonist Charb (who was killed in the Charlie Hebdo shooting), Azcona carried out performances and conferences about freedom of speech in the Krudttønden between 2013 and 2015. In 2015 the Krudttønden building was attacked by terrorists during one of the conferences. Subsequently, the work Eating a Koran was bought by a Danish collector and donated to the Krudttønden for the permanent exhibition.

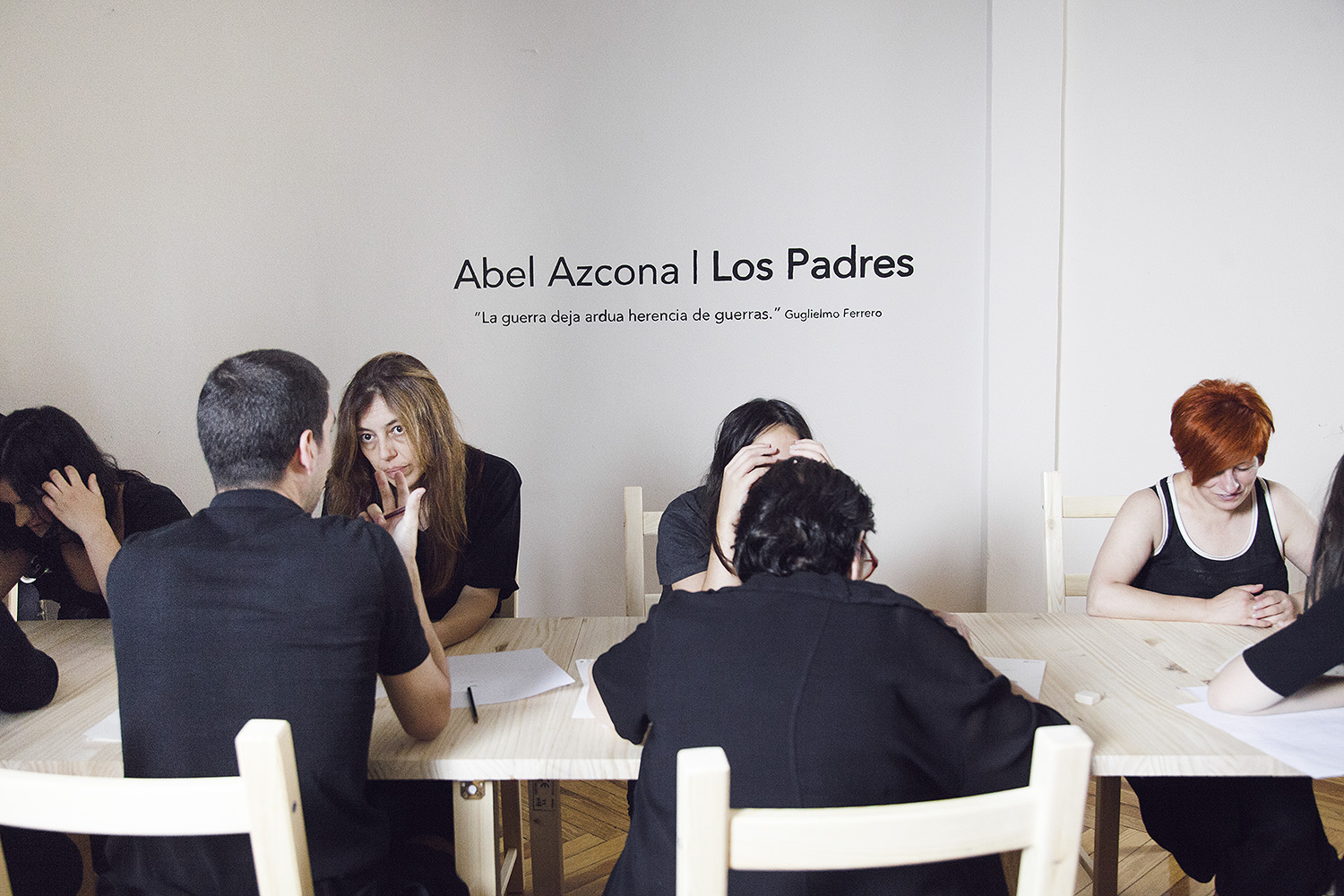
Azcona's Los Padres, Madrid

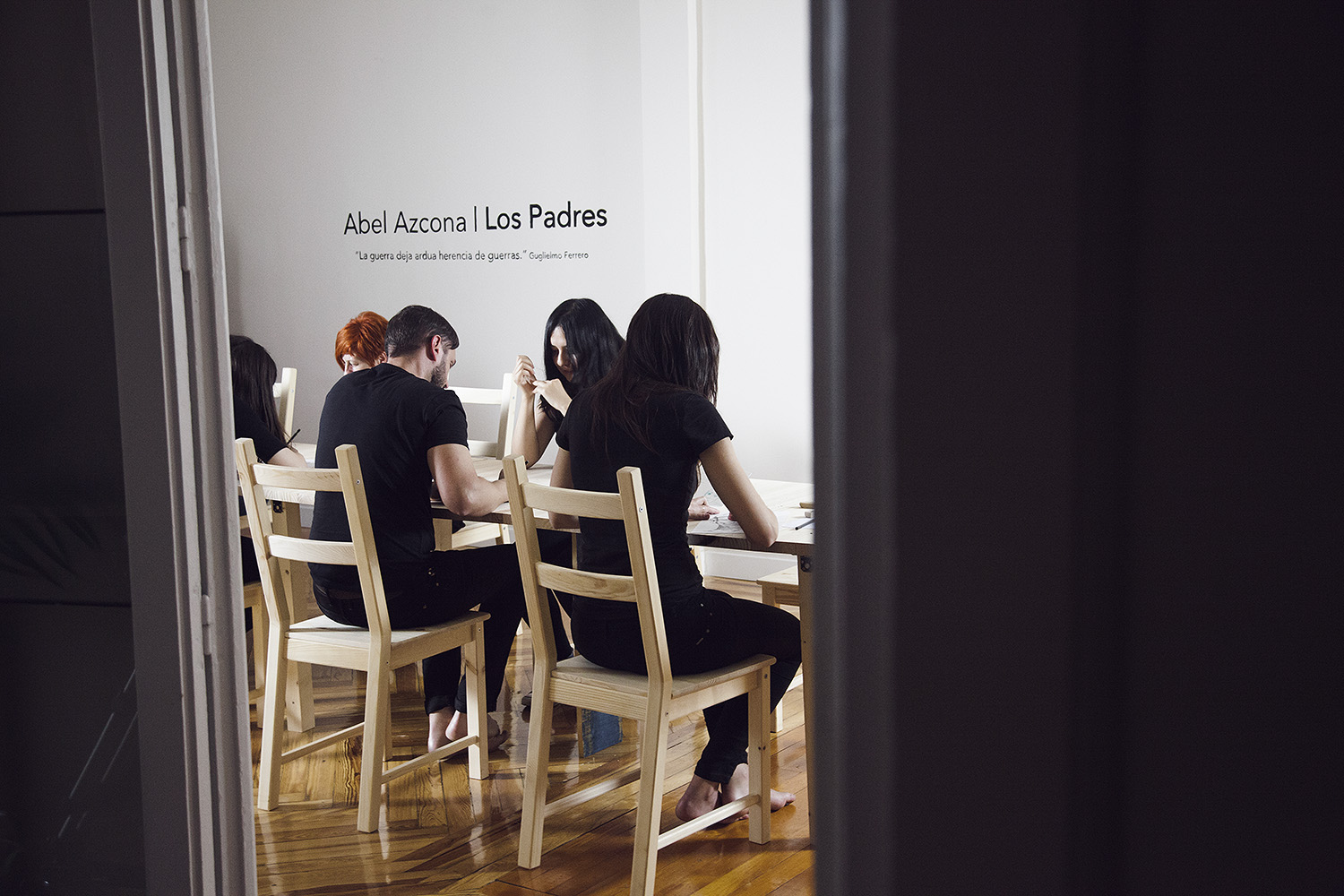
Azcona's Los Padres, Madrid

=== The Fathers ===
The Fathers was first performed in 2016 in Madrid with the final performance, also in Madrid, in 2017; it was in an exhibition format. The piece included dozens of female former prostitutes who gave a physical description of their last client. On the other side of a 10-metre (33 ft) long table, composite artists listened to them and drew images of the clients. The performance generated dozens of portraits which, at the closing of the work in 2017, were exhibited with the premise that any of them could be Azcona's father. The biographical work creates a critical discourse with prostitution and its inheritance, and in the case of Azcona himself, of an unknown father, having been conceived during an act of prostitution.

Abel Azcona, the son of a prostituted woman who is looking for his whoremonger father, because it perfectly summarizes everything that the patriarchy has built on their subordination and for our autonomy. Abel represents the aching son of an unknown father. All of us are those men who walk on their backs. To those who do not see their faces until the end. Those parents who sign unwritten covenants and who leave their semen springs across the planet. Those who rent vaginas, wombs, and maids. It is urgent to face those who prefer to remain installed in comfort. Only in this way will it be possible to turn our face towards the camera, without fear of being recognized in a robot portrait of a whoremonger father. Without fear of the mirror returning the image of a monster.

— Octavio Salazar Benítez, El País, 2019

=== Political Disorder ===
For Political Disorder, Azcona joined many different institutions and political parties. The work was made up of dozens of original documents of affiliation to dozens of political parties in Spain, membership cards or documentation of fees and payments. The piece, in which Azcona joins all the Spanish political parties, is a critique of the system that prioritizes economic interest over true ideology. Azcona joined Falange Española, Vox, the Spanish Socialist Workers' Party and the Popular Party. He also became a member of entities with a political connotation such as the extreme right-wing organization Hazte Oír, the Francisco Franco National Foundation, the Spanish Nazi organization Hogar Social and the "Christian Lawyers". The multi-year project concluded at the Andrés-Missirlian Space Museum in Romainmôtier, Switzerland in 2017. In this exhibition, Azcona included the expulsion letters of each of the political parties and organizations.

=== Buried ===
Buried was created in 2015 through a public and participatory performance, or happening, on the esplanade of the Monument to the Fallen in Pamplona. Azcona invited dozens of relatives of Republicans who were shot, persecuted or disappeared during the Spanish Civil War. Descendants of victims make up the installation in a row in front of the monument, all symbolically buried with soil from the garden of one of the participants, where his relatives had been shot. In 2016, the city of Pamplona invited Azcona to show his work inside the Monument and the project was recreated there, after it had been converted into an exhibition hall, under the title Unearthed: A retrospective view on the political and subversive work of the artist Abel Azcona. The exhibition brought together the Buried project and fragments of all of Azcona's works.

There are symbols that cannot be covered. The Monument to the Fallen of Pamplona is a clear example. Fighting this symbol with another is what Navarrese artist Abel Azcona has proposed, known for his performance, sometimes controversial and often linked to the body. In this case, Azcona does not propose this new art exhibition as a war between symbols, but as an invitation to arouse feelings and, also, as a claim. For him, it is about inciting memory, individual and collective (and, therefore, historical).

— Association for the Recovery of Historical Memory

=== Desafectos ===
In 2016, Azcona coordinated a new performative action, or happening, with relatives of those who were shot in the Pozos de Caudé. Under the name of Desafectos, Azcona formed a wall with the relatives as a complaint, next to the wells outside the city of Teruel, where more than a thousand people had been shot and thrown into the wells over the course of three days during the Civil War.

=== The Nine Confinements or The Deprivation of Liberty ===
The Nine Confinements, also known as The Deprivation of Liberty, was a sequence of performances carried out between 2013 and 2016. All of the series had a theme of deprivation of liberty. The first in the series was performed by Azcona in 2013 and named Confinement in Search of Identity. The artist was to remain for 60 days in a space built inside an art gallery of Madrid, with scarce food resources and in total darkness. The performance was stopped after 42 days for health reasons, with Azcona being subsequently hospitalised. Azcona created these works as a reflection and also a discursive interruption of his own mental illness; themes of mental illness are often present in Azcona's work. Another of the confinements lasted nine days in the Lyon Biennale. Azcona remained inside a garbage container strategically located in the center of the Biennale as a criticism of the artist's own gestation and the market of contemporary art itself. One of the last projects of the series was Black Hole. Performed in 2015, Azcona again remained locked in a small space without light and with poor food in the same art gallery in Madrid. On this occasion, different unknown guests shared the confinement with the artist. Azcona was unaware of the guests' origins and could not see them. Visitors of the art gallery were told of the experience by those entering and leaving the confinement with the artist. All projects were curated and documented from the point of view of the deprivation of liberty including deprivation of food, water, electricity, and contact with the outside.

== Style ==
Azcona's works push his body to the limit and are usually related to social issues. Azcona states that within his works he pursues an end beyond the purely aesthetic. His intent with his works is to question the viewer and force them to react, making his own body the representation of critical and political subjects. The themes of most of his performances are autobiographical and focused on issues such as abandonment, violence, abuse, child abuse, mental illness, deprivation of liberty, prostitution, and life and death. A characteristic of Azcona's work is that he conceives his pieces as process art, which implies that they are of a long duration. Many of his works are created starting with what he calls "a detoner" and, from that first performance, new movements and protests arise, which make the piece discursive.

The body in the art work of Abel Azcona is the stage of re / presentation, place of the event where memory grief, affection and identification, appear in the complex relationship between perceptor-performance-receiver. A place for the question opens up: What to do after the damage? Where is the perpetrator? What responsibility does the watcher hold? Azcona's performances are the place of possibility -even- of the unspeakable, spacing for memory, grief and the question of violence.

— Norma Angélica Silva Gómez, Doctoral Thesis, Abel Azcona: Of empathy as an im-possibility. Colegio de Saberes. Mexico City, 2019

== Controversies ==
Azcona has been involved in several controversies and legal proceedings. In his first actions in the streets of Pamplona in 2005, Azcona was arrested several times. Later, during his self-confinement in the work Dark Room, public opinion was against the harshness of his self-imposed deprivation of liberty and food, generating controversy. The work was stopped after 42 days and the artist admitted to a psychiatric clinic. Similarly, people spoke in favour of ending the work where Azcona stayed continually in a garbage container during the Lyon Biennale.

The works of Azcona with explicit sexuality, such as Empathy and Prostitution and Las Horas, were criticized when shown in cities such as Houston and Mexico City, cities where, at the time of the exposition, anti-sodomy or sexual diversity laws existed. In 2012, he was threatened and persecuted for his work Eating a Koran, in which he ingested a copy of the Koran at University of the Arts in Berlin. During the years 2014 and 2015 he was arrested and his exhibitions in the United States were canceled. In 2014, the first Utero performance in Houston was criticized in the media for "exceeding the limits of integrity and endangering his own life". During a Miami exhibition in 2015, twelve children walked into a performance inside the art gallery with guns in their hands, which was a critique of the laws and the permissibility of weapons in the United States. The exhibition was canceled and Azcona had to return to Europe. A few months later he performed a new work in Chicago, where he denounced the political and ideological nature of Donald Trump. The artistic action was described as "heroic" by the American newspaper Huffington Post. In 2015, he was denounced by the Carlist Traditionalist Union for performing the work Buried inside the Monument to the Fallen of Pamplona. The work demanded memory and reparation for the victims of the Republican side. Its exhibition inside the Monument, built in order to exalt Franco, Mola and Sanjurjo, was considered offensive by the far-right conservatives.

Azcona's work denounces child abuse, and has been persecuted and criticised for being critical of the Church in works such as The Shadow and Amen or The Pederasty. Amen was sued three times before the Superior Court of Justice of Navarre for three crimes and alleged desecration and blasphemy. The first lawsuit was brought by the Archbishopric of Pamplona and Tudela, who are representatives of the Catholic Church in the north of Spain; the second lawsuit was brought by the Delegation of the Government in Navarre, controlled by the Popular Party at the time; and the third was by the Asociación Española de Abogados Cristianos (Spanish Association of Christian Lawyers), who also made criminal complaints against Azcona. The lawsuits were all won by Azcona, but the group took the complaint to the Supreme Court. Whilst awaiting the case being heard by the Supreme Court, the Association of Christian Lawyers (acting alone) started a protest against Spain in the European Court of Human Rights in Strasbourg for not condemning Azcona, and, according to them, for protecting him. Each time the work was shown, the complaint was re-formulated, so Azcona was cited in the Court of Justice of Palma de Mallorca and in the High Court of Justice of Catalonia in Barcelona. After five years of judicial proceedings for works critical of the Catholic Church and, more specifically, criticism relating to pedophilia, Azcona announced his intent to be "disobedient" in relation to the charges, and the complainants added obstruction of justice to their complaints.

When the High Court of Justice of Catalonia issued a judicial arrest warrant in 2019 after Azcona failed to appear before the court for the third time, Azcona went into exile and settled in Lisbon, Portugal. This has not prevented him from opening new exhibitions in the Spain and publishing critical works. He defends his artistic ideology and his political ideas, which are supported by certain sectors of the Spanish left-wing. Conversely, his works are seen as desecration and sacrilege by the most conservative sector of Spanish and Latin American society.

In 2016, Azcona was denounced for exalting terrorism. In his exhibition Still Life, Azcona recreated, in the form of sculptures, performance and hyper-realistic installations, current and historical situations of violence in diverse themes such as historical memory, terrorism and conflict. Two years later, in 2018, he was denounced by the Francisco Franco National Foundation for exposing a signed detonation report for the Monument of the Valley of the Fallen. He was also criticized by Israel for the piece The Shame, where the artist installed fragments of the Berlin Wall along the West Bank Wall. The same year he represented Spain at the Asia Art Biennale in Dhaka: his installation featured wooden chairs with distressed children from the streets of Dhaka, and the performance was interrupted by protests from the organisation and its attendees.

== Bibliography ==
- Winter Solstice [Compilation of performative work]. Stolon. 2014. ISBN 978-1938022715.
- "Not Wanted [Catalog on the occasion of Retrospective Exhibition]". Salón de Agosto [Catálogo]. Museo de Arte Contemporáneo de Bogotá. 2014. ISSN 1909-3543.
- The Moving Heaven [Collective Political Essay by Pedro Almodóvar, Luis Eduardo Aute and Abel Azcona]. Dos Bigotes. 2015. ISBN 978-8494967443.
- The Hours [Compilation of performative work. Biographical Stories]. Maretti. 2016. ISBN 978-8898855490.
- Contemporary Art Essays [Ensayo]. Plataforma de Arte Contemporáneo. 2017. ISBN 978-8494232190.
- Curatorships. Contemporary Visions. [Recopilación obra en colecciones]. Museo de Arte Contemporáneo de Bogotá. 2017. ISBN 978-958-763-198-2.
- Manifiest [Political Essay]. Con-Tensión Editorial. 2018.
- Presumption of the artist as a radical and disobedient subject, both in life and death [Manifiesto]. Círculo de Bellas Artes. 2018.
- Liberty of exception [Collective Political Essay by Carles Puigdemont, Jordi Cuixart and Abel Azcona]. Pages Editors. 2018. ISBN 978-8413030135.
- Theory of Performance Art. Roca Umbert Museum. 2018.
- Practice of Performance Art. Roca Umbert Museum. 2018.
- Abel Azcona 1988-2018 [Anthology]. Prologue by Tania Bruguera and Pussy riot. MueveTuLengua. 2019. ISBN 978-8417284527.
- Abel Azcona, art, action & rebellion [Recopilación obra performativa]. Sant Fruitós de Bages. 2019. ISBN 978-8409100040.
- The Little Buds [Biographical Stories]. Dos Bigotes. 2019. ISBN 9788494967443.
- Act of disobedience [Political Essay]. Milenio. 2019. ISBN 978-8497438643.

== Filmography ==
- The Stoning (2011). Directed by Abel Azcona. Video art piece generated from the performance The Stoning, documentation of the art work developed in the historic center of Pamplona.
- Empathy and Prostitution (2013). Directed by Abel Azcona. Video art piece generated from the Empathy and Prostitution performance, developed in Houston by Abel Azcona.
- Antibasque (2014). Directed by Karlos Alastruey. Documentary about the Basque conflict designed following Abel Azcona's performance in Basque lands.
- The Miracle (2015). Directed by Abel Azcona. Video art piece generated from the performance The Miracle, documentation of the art work developed in different Mediterranean Beaches.
- Abel Azcona: Born In Darkness (2016). Directed by Karlos Alastruey. Documentary about life and artwork of Abel Azcona.
- A day in the life of Abel Azcona (2016). Documentary about one day in the life of the artist Abel Azcona.
- Still Life (2017). Directed by Abel Azcona. Video art piece generated from the Still Life Art Project, developed in Roca Umbert Museum by Abel Azcona.
- The Fathers (2017). Directed by Abel Azcona. Video Art Piece generated from the artwork The Fathers, documentation of the performance art developed in an art gallery in Madrid.
- In Harm's Way (2017). Directed by Abel Azcona. Video art piece directed by Abel Azcona for music video of the singer Amanda Palmer on the drama of the refugees in the Mediterranean Sea.
- The Shame (2018). Directed by Abel Azcona. Videoart piece generated from The Shame performance, generated along the West Bank Wall.
- You will be a man (2018). Directed by Isabel de Ocampo. Documentary about new masculinities and the search for origins of Abel Azcona.
- Abel Azcona: Creadorxs (2018). Directed by Neurads for El País. Documentary chapter about life and artwork of Abel Azcona.
