= Cultural depictions of Emiliano Zapata =

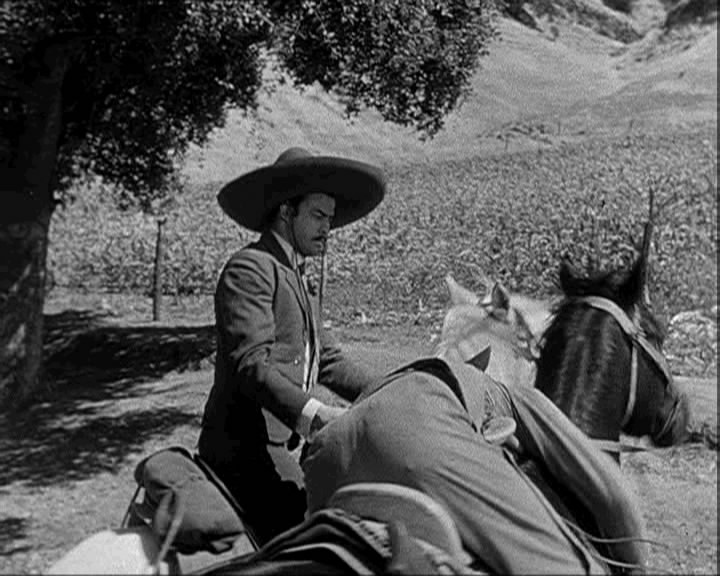
Marlon Brando as Zapata in the 1952 film Viva Zapata!

References and depictions of Mexican revolutionary Emiliano Zapata, places and things named for and commemorating him.

== Places named after Emiliano Zapata ==
- Metro Zapata, Mexico City Metro
- Emiliano Zapata, Morelos
- Emiliano Zapata, Veracruz
- Emiliano Zapata, Baja California Sur
- Emiliano Zapata, Chiapas
- Emiliano Zapata, Chihuahua
- Emiliano Zapata, Coahuila
- Emiliano Zapata, Durango
- Emiliano Zapata Norte, Mérida, Yucatán
- Emiliano Zapata, Michoacán
- Emiliano Zapata, Nuevo León
- Emiliano Zapata, Sonora
- Emiliano Zapata, Tamaulipas
- Emiliano Zapata, Tlaxcala
- Emiliano Zapata, Zacatecas

And many other towns, schools, streets, housing developments, etc. across the country

- Zapata Park is named after Emiliano Zapata.
- The famous Mi Tierra Cafe & Bakery in San Antonio takes its name from Zapata's slogan "La Tierra es para quien la trabaja" or "The land belongs to those who work it". The restaurant's founder was an admirer and reputedly a former supporter of Zapata and the restaurant still sells Zapata souvenirs.
- Zapatas Cantina Mexicana Restaurant - named in memory of Mexican revolutionary leader Emiliano Zapata now a bar and restaurant in Angeles City, Philippines.

== Emiliano Zapata in books ==
- Zapata the Unconquerable (1941), by Edgcumb Pinchon
- In E.L. Doctorow's historical fiction novel Ragtime (1975), the character of Mother's Younger Brother goes off to join Zapata in the Mexican Revolution after the main events in the novel.
- El compadre Mendoza of the Revolution Trilogy by Fernando de Fuentes includes character of General Felipe Nieto, a fictitious Zapata cousin resembling Zapata's life and zapatism itself.
- In the novel The Friends of Pancho Villa (1996), by James Carlos Blake, Zapata is a major character.
- Zapata is a central character in the short story, "Eyes of Zapata" from the collection, Woman Hollering Creek and Other Stories (1991), by Sandra Cisneros.

== Emiliano Zapata in movies and TV ==
- The western subgenre Zapata Western.
- The film Viva Zapata! (1952), with Marlon Brando as Zapata
- The film Lucio Vázquez (1968), with Jaime Fernández as Zapata
- The film Lauro Puñales (1969), with Jaime Fernández reprising the role of Zapata
- The film Emiliano Zapata (1970), with Antonio Aguilar as Zapata
- The film Pafnucio Santo (1977), with Gina Morett as Zapata
- The Mexican-Russian film Red Bells (1982), with Jorge Luke as Zapata
- The film Zapata en Chinameca (1988), with Antonio Aguilar reprising the role of Zapata
- In the film Y tu mamá también (2001), one of the main characters, portrayed by Gael García Bernal, is named Julio Zapata (all of the lead characters have historically significant last names).
- The film Zapata: El sueño de un héroe (2004) with Alejandro Fernández as Zapata
- The film El Fin del sur (2004), with Gabriel Porras as Zapata
- The film Santos peregrinos (2004), with Alberto Estrella as Zapata
- The miniseries Zapata: Amor en Rebeldía (2004: Telemundo or Argos), with Demián Bichir as Zapata
- Zapata appears in the Mexican telenovelas Senda de gloria (1987) with Manuel Ojeda as Zapata and El vuelo del águila (1994).
- Zapata has also been represented in the movies by Tony Davis (1969)
- Nickelodeon game show Legends of the Hidden Temple had an episode where the artifact the teams competed to retrieve from the temple was The Applewood Amulet of Emiliano Zapata.
- In the 2007 film Ocean's 13, the character Virgil refers to Emiliano Zapata to inspire his fellow maquiladora workers.

== Emiliano Zapata in music ==
- Andy Irvine released the self-penned song "Viva Zapata!" on his 1991 album Rude Awakening
- In the 1996 musical version of E.L. Doctorow's historical fiction novel Ragtime, the character of Mother's Younger Brother goes off to join Zapata in the Mexican Revolution.
- Political funk metal band Rage Against the Machine have a song, "Zapata's Blood" on their 1998 album Live & Rare, and also refer to him in their songs "Calm Like A Bomb" and "Maria"
- Australian band Midnight Oil quote Zapata at the conclusion of their song "Power and the Passion" from their 1982 album 10, 9, 8, 7, 6, 5, 4, 3, 2, 1 with the line: "It is better to die on your feet, than live on your knees".
- cLOUDDEAD reference him in the song Son of a Gun.
- Spanish ska punk music group Ska-P has a song dedicated to the memory of Zapata called Juan sin tierra, written by Jorge Saldaña, which contains the line, "Gritó Emiliano Zapata: Quiero tierra y libertad. Y el gobierno se reía cuando lo iban a enterrar." (Emiliano Zapata shouted: I want land and freedom. And the government laughed as they went to bury him.)
- Finnish leftist hardcore punk band Etulinja has a song called Zapata -vive!
- Indie rock group Spoon, which hails from Austin, Texas, uses Zapata's image accompanied by the text "Austin, Tejas" on a 2006 tour T-shirt.
- A 1970s Mexican psychedelic rock band called themselves La Revolución de Emiliano Zapata.
- Mexican rock group Maná reference Zapata in their song, "Justicia, Tierra, y Libertad", from their 2002 release entitled Revolución De Amor.
- Swedish electro group The Knife has a song called "Zapata"
- The Cincinnati-based American brass band "the Queen City Zapatistas" take their name from the fallen leader, but do not subscribe to any political affiliation.
- Oakland, California rock band Totimoshi has a song called "Viva Zapata" on their album Ladron
- Warren Zevon references Zapata in his song "Veracruz."
- Italian ska band Banda Bassotti wrote a song titled "Viva Zapata!", inserted on "Avanzo de cantiere"
- German ska punk music group Rantanplan with their song "Tierra Y Libertad"
- The song, Fernando, by the Swedish pop group ABBA depicts two veterans of the 1910 revolution under Zapata according to Björn Ulvaeus in an ABBA special interview screened on December 31, 2008 in Australia.
- French band Mano Negra has a song called "Viva Zapata" on Casa Babylon with the repeated phrase "El pueblo unido jamás será vencido".
- The "Rap Metal" band Rage Against the Machine features a reference to Zapata in their lyrics for the song Calm Like a Bomb. The 2001 video release The Battle of Mexico City discusses their support for political movements such as the Zapatistas and the revolution in the Mexican State of Chiapas.
- The late lead singer of The Gits, Mia Zapata, has been rumored to have been a descendant of Emiliano Zapata.
- The song "Zapata" by Peso Pluma, from his album Génesis, references Zapata in the song title and lyrics.
- The song "Tudo O Que Voce Podia Ser" by Milton Nascimento, from his collaborative album with Lô Borges, Clube da Esquina, references Zapata in the lyrics.

== Tourism and museums ==
The Ruta Zapata through important sites in southeastern Morelos serves as a pilgrimage path for latter-day Zapata admirers.

Some of these sites are :

- Casa de Zapata museum in Anenecuilco.
- Ex Cuartel de Emiliano Zapata (Zapata's former headquarters) in Tlaltizapan.
- Hacienda de Chinameca site of Zapata's death and an equestrian statue of Zapata.
- Plazuela de la Revolución del Sur in Cuautla.

== Murals and other depictions in art ==
- Mural by Diego Rivera in the Palacio Nacional, Mexico City
- Mural by Diego Rivera in Teatro Insurgentes, Mexico City
- Mural by Diego Rivera at the Escuela de Chapingo
- Zapata (lithograph) by Diego Rivera
- Other murals and artworks by José Clemente Orozco and David Alfaro Siqueiros
- Casa Zapata murals at Stanford University
- 6th St. and Westlake street mural in Los Angeles, California
- José Guadalupe Posada, political printmaker and engraver
- La Revolución, controversial feminized painting of Zapata produced by Fabián Cháirez in 2014.
