= Statue of Emiliano Zapata =

The statue of Emiliano Zapata may refer to:

- Statue of Emiliano Zapata, Cholula, Puebla, Mexico
- Statue of Emiliano Zapata (San Diego), California, United States
- Equestrian statue of Emiliano Zapata (Los Angeles), California, United States
