= Zapata (lithograph) =

Lithograph by Diego Rivera

- Alternate Titles “Zapata and His Horse” “Agrarian Leader Zapata’’
- Artist: Diego Rivera
- Year: 1932
- Type: Lithograph
- Subject: Emiliano Zapata
- Dimensions: Image: 13 1/8 by 16 1/4 inches (330 mm × 410 mm), Sheet: 14 by 17 1/16 inches (356 mm × 433 mm)
- Location: University of Arizona Museum of Art, Tucson

Zapata (1932) is a lithograph by the Mexican artist Diego Rivera that depicts the Mexican revolutionary Emiliano Zapata (1879-1919) as he holds the reins of a horse among a group of campesinos (peasants). The lithographic edition was created and printed twelve years after Zapata's assassination. Zapata is based on Agrarian Leader Zapata (1931), one of eight "portable" frescoes produced explicitly for Rivera's solo exhibition at the Museum of Modern Art (MoMA) in 1931, which was adapted from his previous Revolt panel from a fresco titled The History of Cuernavaca and Morelos (1929–30) painted in the Palace of Cortés, Cuernavaca. There were 100 original prints of the lithograph, many of which are in the collections of various art museums.

== Context ==
In 1930, with his popularity on the rise with American audiences, Diego Rivera began to make lithographic prints for the American art market at the request of his gallerist, Carl Zigrosser, director of the Weyhe Gallery in New York, and Rivera's friend William Spratling. Rivera quickly adapted to the medium, admitting to Zigrosser that he had been seduced by the direct contact of the lithographic crayon to the stone's surface.

In 1931 Diego Rivera became the second artist ever to hold a solo exhibition at the Museum of Modern Art, following Henri Matisse’s solo exhibition earlier that year. Rivera's exhibition was described as a "media event" and broke all museum attendance records at the time, drawing 56,575 attendees—more than double the attendance of the Mattisse show. For this exhibition, Rivera created several "portable murals," based on details of his murals in Mexico, for the purpose of connecting public American interest in his work with the original frescoes. The murals proved portable in name only: each panel, constructed of concrete poured over an armature of iron and steel, weighed nearly 1,000 pounds. To disseminate the mural images more widely, Rivera and Zigrosser elected to reproduce them as lithographs, which were affordable and accessible. This lithograph, along with four others, was created at the George C. Miller Print Shop in New York and published in 1932 by the Weyhe Gallery in New York. Rivera redrew the images for the prints himself and remained in New York after the MoMA exhibition to oversee their production.

That Rivera was urged to create these lithographs speaks to his popularity as a celebrated Mexican artist in the United States. Zapata, the fifth of this series of five, is Rivera's best known and most-admired print. As Lyle Williams points out, "Diego Rivera's lithograph Zapata, 1932, is one of the seminal images of twentieth century printmaking, a landmark in the history not only of Mexican Art but of modern art."

== Description ==
Emiliano Zapata stands in the foreground. In his left hand, he holds the bridle of a white horse and in his right he wields a sickle used for cutting sugarcane, the staple hacienda product of Zapata's home state of Morelos. Zapata and the horse stand above the prone figure of a hacendado (hacienda owner) whose gloved hand rests upon Zapata's left foot. The fallen man wears dark clothing and riding boots; a cutlass lies on the ground beside him. Behind Zapata stands a group of seven peasants armed with farming implements: one carries a sickle, another a bow and arrows, and two carry coas de jima, hoe-like tools with round blades used for harvesting agave. Both Zapata and his followers wear white peasant clothing typical of the Cuernavaca region of Mexico. Zapata and two others are seen to wear huaraches (sandals), while the others go barefoot. Several wear sombreros (wide-brimmed hats). Broad-leaved plants—likely Calla lilies, which Rivera used extensively in his work—frame the scene on the right side of the print. The background is a vague and natural environment, as observed by Oles, to emphasize the popular culture and idealization of folkways of Mexico rather than its monuments.

== Style ==
This lithograph is characterized by smooth, curvilinear forms whose volumes are rendered with the even gradients of tone typical of Rivera's style. Rivera achieved the varied tones within the print by shading and crosshatching with lithographic crayon. Rivera used tonal variations in the black and white Zapata to similar effect as he did color in the painted murals he used as its source material. In the lithograph, the lightest areas in Zapata's white clothing and the white body of the horse he leads are sharply delineated against the dark background and the mid tones of the clothing of Zapata's followers. This contrast draws the viewer's attention to the figures of the rebel leader and the horse and establishes their preeminence within the composition. In his mural, Agrarian Leader Zapata, one of the sources for the lithograph, Rivera accentuated the two figures by leaving the fresco's brilliant white plaster undercoat exposed. Though the lithograph is aesthetically inspired by the mural, the close cropping of the scene decontextualizes the figures in the lithograph. The original mural provides a gruesome focal point for Zapata and his followers, however the lithograph, created for an American audience, indicates Zapata's gaze to fall on the floral, tropical setting. This alteration removes the political associations inherent to the mural.

Rivera's print shows parallels with Paolo Uccello’s early fifteenth-century painting The Battle of San Romano (c. 1438). Both works depict a white horse similar in size to the human figures pictured, figures bristling with armaments receding into the background, and weapons underfoot in the foreground. Rivera did in fact make numerous sketches of Uccello's horses during a trip to Italy in 1920–1921.

In both its representational quality and its overtly political message, Zapata is typical of Social Realism, an international art movement that aimed to create art that would empower the working class.

== Other Representations of Zapata by Rivera ==
Previous to the mural at the Palace of Cortés, Cuernavaca and its subsequent depiction in the Zapata MoMA mural and lithograph, Rivera's 1930–1931 painting Zapata depicted the figure based on a photograph showing him in Cuernavaca in 1911, in which he brandishes a modern rifle and wears the ornate costume of the charro, or horsemen. However, for the Zapata Palace of Cortés mural, the MoMA mural, and the lithograph, Rivera chose to eliminate the symbolic references to power and status and instead opted to depict Zapata as a campesino. The simple dress separated him from the ruling elite and characterized him as a folk hero. This further idealized Zapata following his assassination in 1919.

It was clear to Rivera that there were three ways of seeing Zapata; one as the idealized charro revolutionary, one as the leader of the campesino movement, and finally, as martyr. Both Rivera's lithograph and paintings of Zapata denote that Rivera was careful to choose the way in which he represented Zapata.

Another Mexican artist, José Clemente Orozco "scorned this type of imagery as romanticizing poverty and backwardness; nevertheless, in their very idealization, these images reassured viewers in Mexico and abroad that the peasants behind the Revolution were actually contained and content."

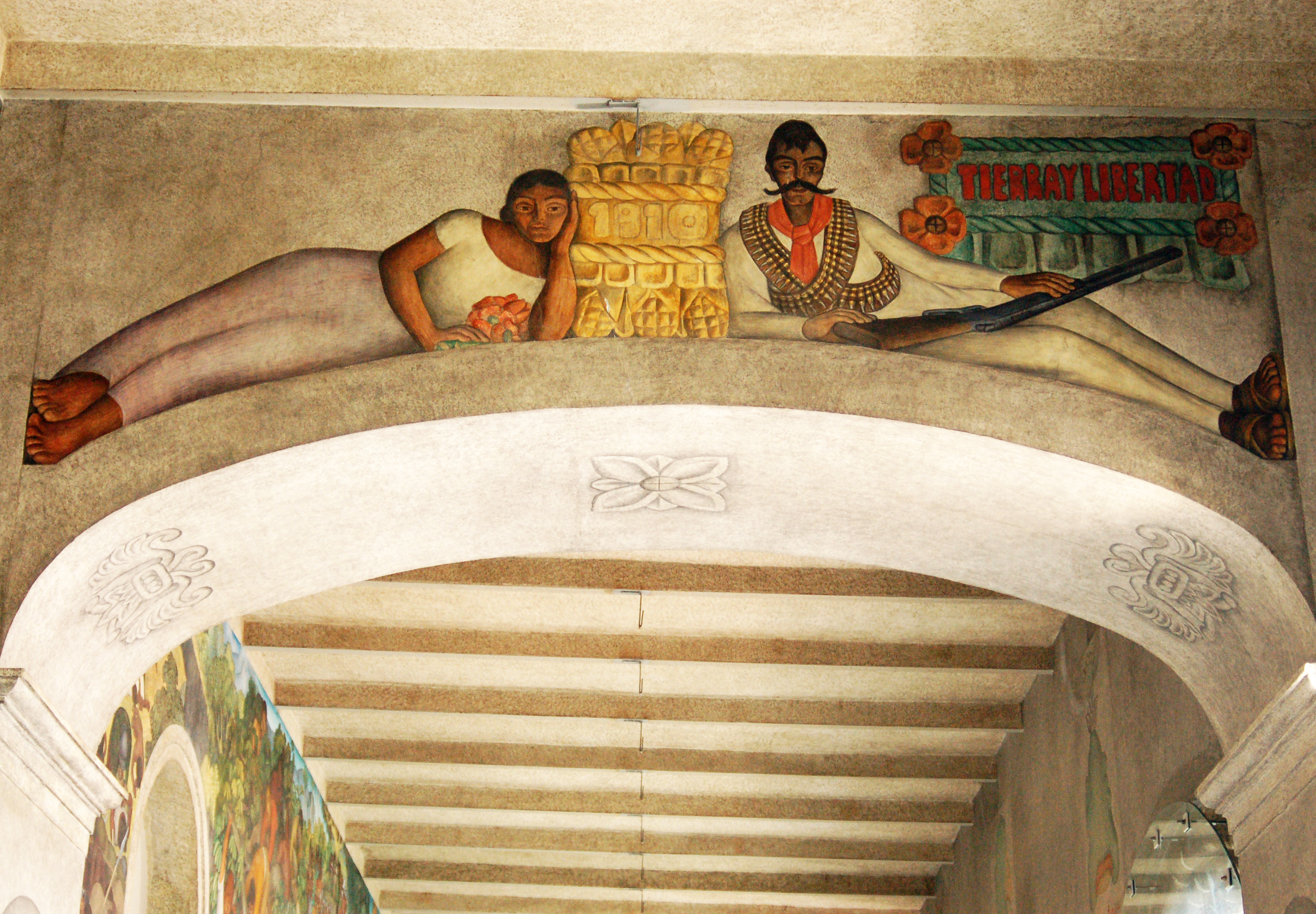
The History of Cuernavaca and Morelos

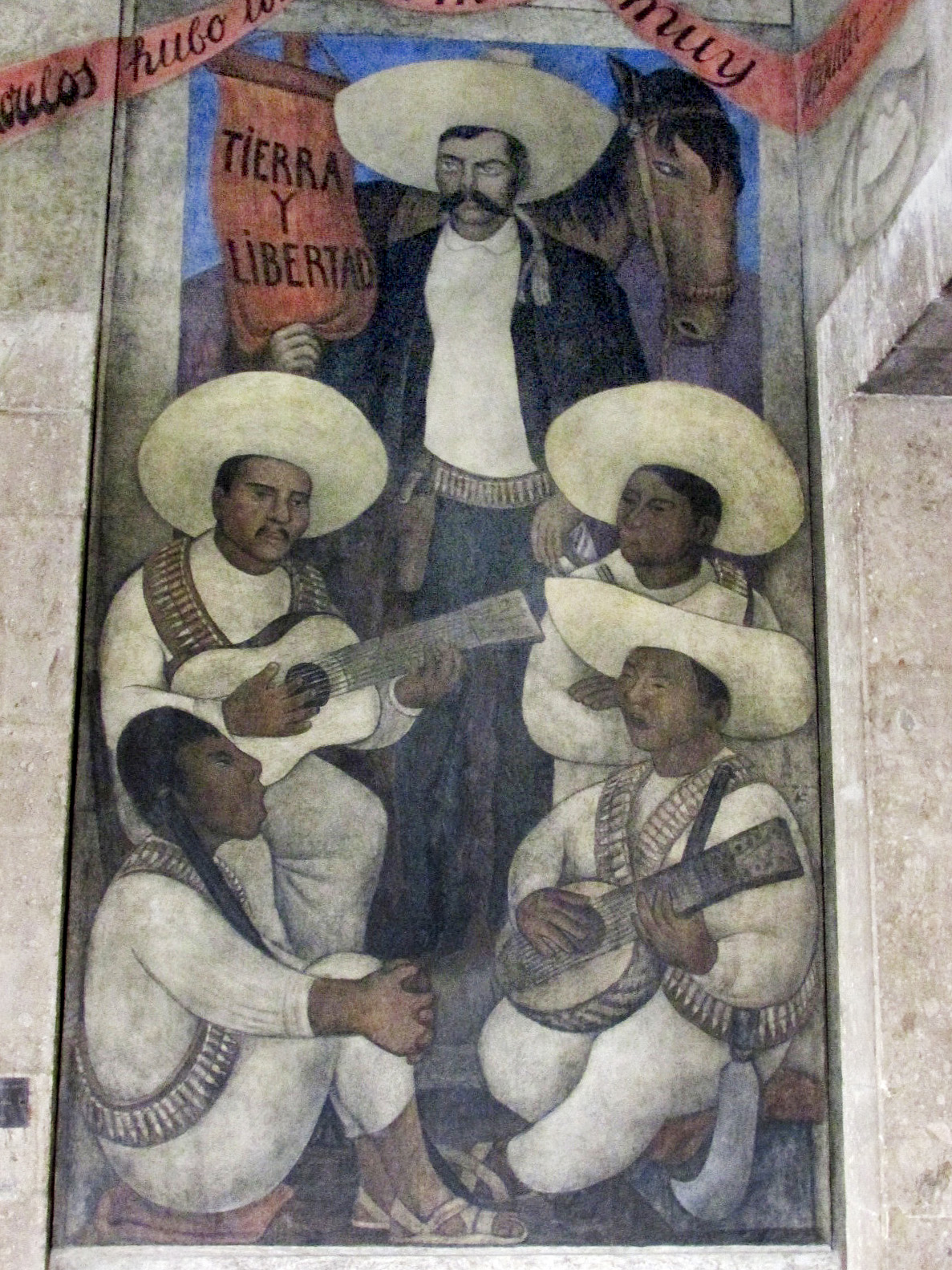
Secretaría de Educación Pública

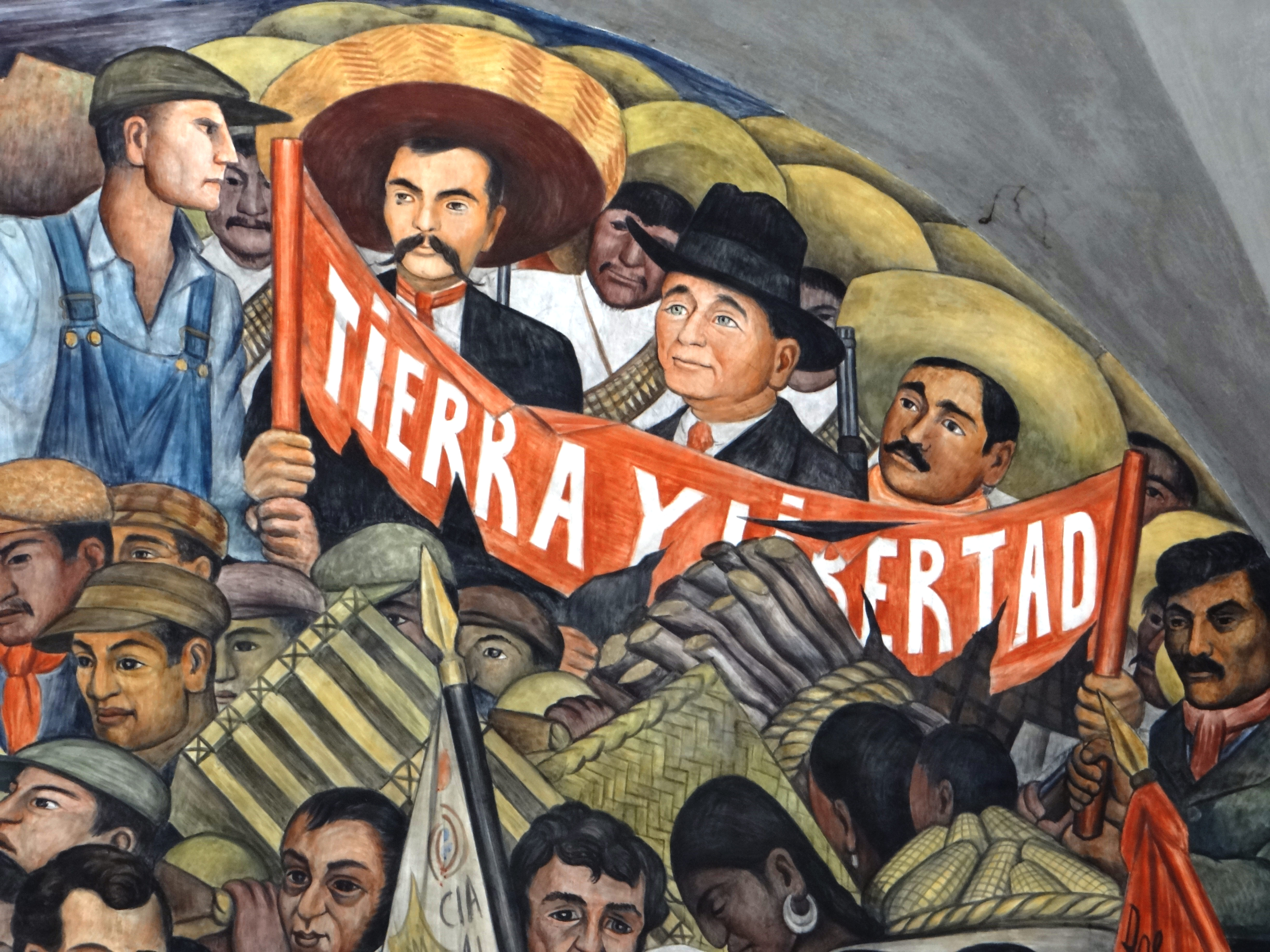
Detail from The History of Mexico fresco, 1929–1935. West wall, detail of central arch. National Palace, Mexico City.

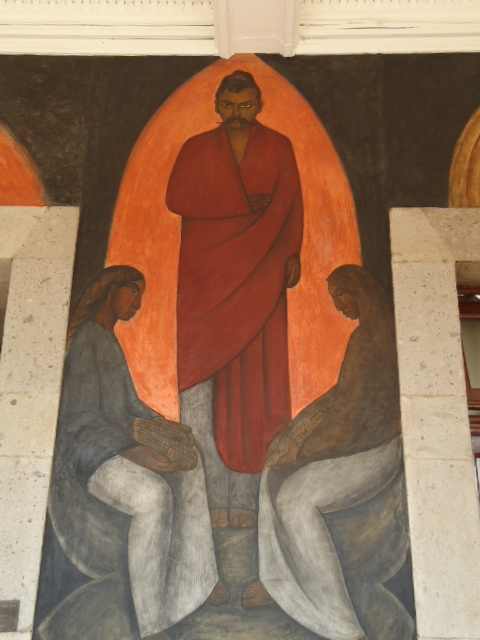
Martyr

== Photographs of Zapata ==
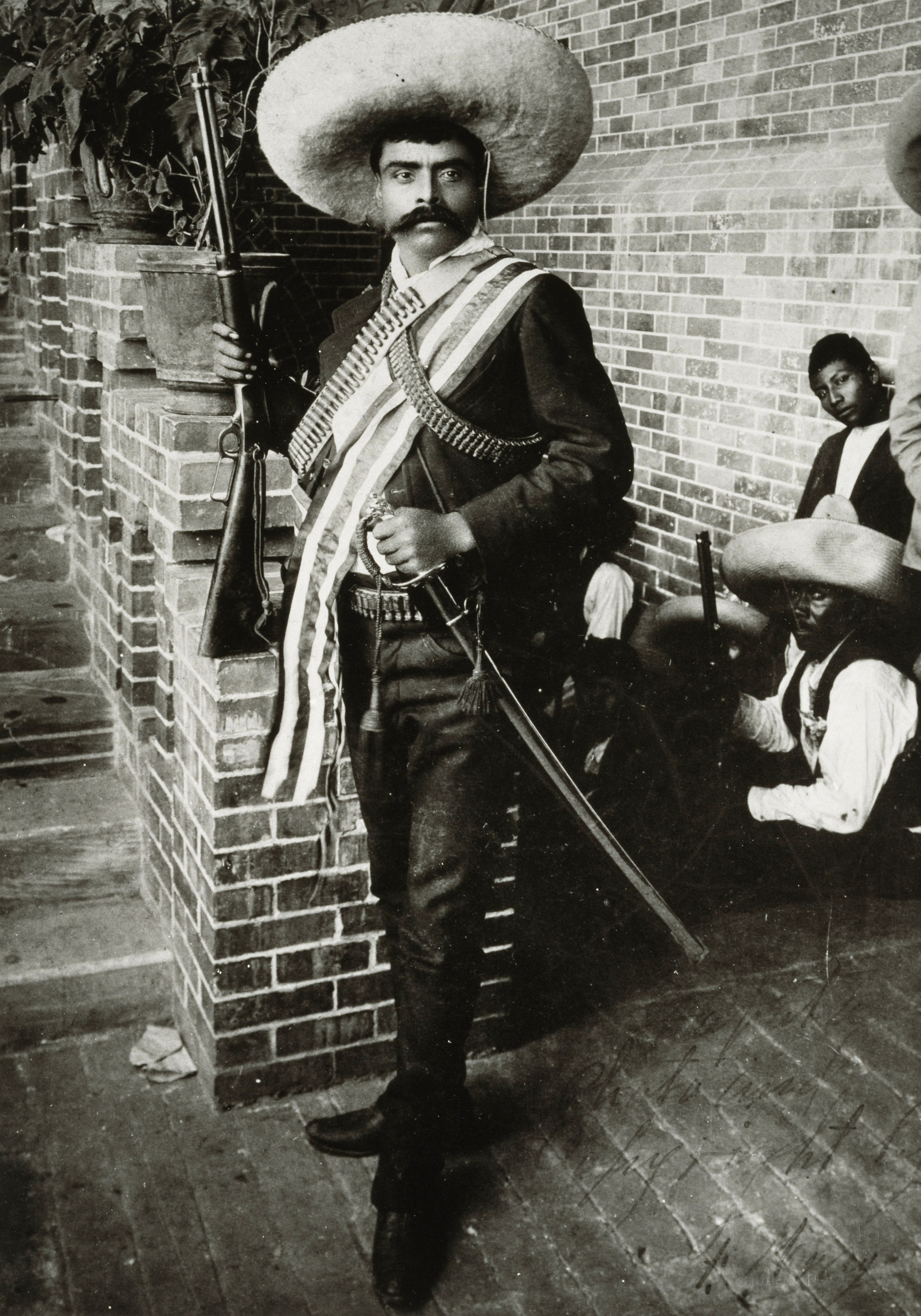
Emiliano Zapata; photograph by Hugo Brehme - 1911

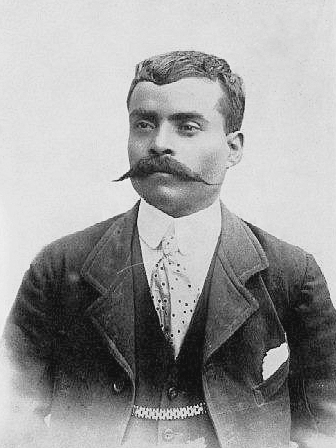
General Emiliano Zapata - 1914

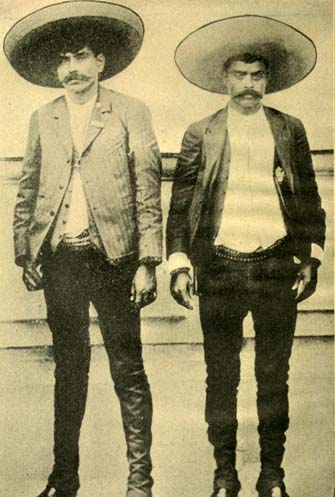
Eufemio and Emiliano Zapata - 1910

== Editions ==
Single edition: 100 prints plus artist proofs and cancellation proof. Printed by George C. Miller, New York. Published by Weyhe Gallery, New York in 1932.

== Collections ==
A list of museums and institutions that have the lithograph in their permanent collection. In addition to prints listed below, the Dolores Olmedo Museum is home to print 92 of 100.

| Title | Collection/Credit line | Print # | Institution |
|---|---|---|---|
| Zapata | Gift of W. G. Russell Allen | 4/100 | Museum of Fine Arts, Boston |
| Zapata | Edward J. Gallagher Jr. Memorial Fund | 9/100 | University of Arizona Museum of Art |
| Zapata | Charles Stewart Smith Memorial Fund | 82/100 | Brooklyn Museum |
| Emiliano Zapata and His Horse | The Harris Brisbane Dick Fund | 88/100 | Metropolitan Museum of Art |
| Zapata and His Men (Zapata y sus hombres); alternate title: Zapata y Hombres | Gift of Mr. J. J. Cohn (M.61.43.1) | 91/100 | Los Angeles County Museum of Art (LACMA) |
| Zapata | Print Sales Miscellaneous Fund, 1935.230 | 96/100 | Art Institute of Chicago |
| Zapata | Gift of Abby Aldrich Rockefeller | | Museum of Modern Art |
| Emilano Zapata | Gift of the Print Club of Cleveland (1934.166) | | Cleveland Museum of Art |
| Zapata | Gift of Karl Zigrosser | | Philadelphia Museum of Art |

== See also ==
- List of works by Diego Rivera

== Bibliography ==
- Cardoza y Aragón, Luís, Diego Rivera: A Retrospective. New York: Founders Society, Detroit Institute of Arts, in association with W.W. Norton, 1986.
- Delpar, Helen, The Enormous Vogue of Things Mexican: Cultural Relations Between the United States and Mexico, 1920–1935. Tuscaloosa and New York: University of Alabama Press, 1992.
- Dickerman, Leah and Anna Indych-López, Diego Rivera: Murals for the Museum of Modern Art. New York: Museum of Modern Art, 2011.
- Hurlburt, Lawrence P., The Mexican Muralists in the United States Albuquerque: University of New Mexico Press, 1991.
- Indych-López, Anna, Muralism Without Walls: Rivera, Orozco, and Siqueiros in the United States, 1927. University of Pittsburgh Press: Pittsburgh, 2009.
- Ittmann, John, ‘Diego Rivera’ Mexico and Modern Printmaking: A Revolution in The Graphic Arts 1920 to 1950. Connecticut: Yale University Press, 2006.
- Metropolitan Museum of Art, Mexico: Splendors of 30 Centuries, 1990.
- Oles, James, Art and Architecture in Mexico. New York: Thames & Hudson, 2013.
- Oles, James, Mexican Muralists: Diego Rivera, José Clemente Orozco, and David Alfaro Siqueiros. The Museum of Modern Art. New York: The Museum of Modern Art, 2011.
- Rivera, Diego, Agrarian Leader Zapata, 1931. Fresco. Museum of Modern Art, http://www.moma.org/collection/object.php?object_id=80682.
- Rivera, Diego, Emiliano Zapata and His Horse, (88/100), 1932. Metropolitan Museum of Art, http://www.metmuseum.org/collection/the-collection-online/search/656904.
- Rivera, Diego, Zapata and His Men, (91/100), 1932. Los Angeles County Museum of Art,
- Rivera, Diego, Zapata, 1932 (96/100), Art Institute Chicago, http://www.artic.edu/aic/collections/artwork/111349.
- Rivera, Diego, Zapata, (4/100), 1932. Lithograph. Museum of Fine Arts, Boston,
- Rivera, Diego, Zapata, 1932. Lithograph. Museum of Modern Art, http://www.moma.org/collection/object.php?object_id=77166.
- Rivera, Diego, Zapata, 1932. Lithograph. Philadelphia Museum of Art,
- Rivera, Diego, Zapata, (9/100), 1932. Lithograph. University of Arizona Museum of Art, http://www.artmuseum.arizona.edu.
- Schell, William, "Emiliano Zapata and the Old Regime: Myth, Memory, and Method". Mexican Studies/Estudios Mexicanos 25 (2)(2009): 327–365.
- Uccello, Paolo, The Battle of San Romano, 1438–1440. National Gallery, London,
- Williams, Lyle W., 'Evolution of a Revolution: a Brief History of Printmaking in Mexico' in Mexico and Modern Printmaking: A Revolution in The Graphic Arts 1920 to 1950, 2006.
