= La Revolución (painting) =

2014 artwork by Fabián Cháirez

- Artist: Fabián Cháirez
- Year: 2014
- Medium: Oil on canvas
- Subject: Emiliano Zapata
- Dimensions: 40.5 cm × 30 cm (15.9 in × 12 in)
- Location: Museu de l'Art Prohibit Collection, Barcelona
- Owner: Tatxo Benet
- Website: museuartprohibit.org

La Revolución (Note: lit. transl. The Revolution) is a 2014 painting by Fabián Cháirez. Measuring 40.5 cm × 30 cm (15.9 in × 11.8 in), the oil-on-canvas work was first exhibited at the Galería José María Velasco in Mexico City between 2015 and 2016. It depicts Mexican revolutionary Emiliano Zapata nude in a provocative pose, wearing a pink sombrero and high heels made of pistols, seated on a horse with an erect penis. The author views the piece as a reinterpretation of Zapata's image that positions him within the struggle for sexual minorities.

In 2020, the artwork was displayed at the art exhibition Emiliano. Zapata después de Zapata, at the Museum of the Palacio de Bellas Artes, where it was selected as the image for the exhibition's promotional poster. During the exhibition, the painting received polarized reactions from the audience and was embroiled in controversy due to debates over the non-hegemonic representation of Zapata. His descendants announced legal action against Cháirez and the museum. Scholars have noted that the work questions dominant cultural values and historical narratives, contrasting with classical depictions of Zapata. Critics emphasized that the artwork's meaning is not fixed but emerges through viewers' interpretations, reflecting cultural and personal assumptions about gender, sexuality, and national identity.

In January 2020, La Revolución was acquired by Tatxo Benet and added to his Censored Art Collection. It is displayed at the Museu de l'Art Prohibit Collection in Barcelona, Spain.

== Description ==
La Revolución is a 40.5 cm × 30 cm (16-by-11 3/4-inch) oil painting on canvas depicting the Mexican revolutionary leader Emiliano Zapata, a brown-skinned man, nude and riding a white horse. Zapata wears a pink charro hat and a sash in the colors of the Mexican flag (green, white, and red) across his torso. His legs, positioned over the animal, resemble those of a woman, and he wears high-heeled shoes with pistol-shaped heels. The horse, shown mid-leap, is portrayed with an erect penis. Both subjects are painted against a warm background, and the artwork is set in a golden frame. The artist Fabián Cháirez painted it in 2014 and explained that he wanted to "resignify [Zapata's] image and bring him into the fight for sexual marginalities [as] he has been embraced as a banner for struggles and as a symbol of a type of aggressive masculinity in which not everyone fits". He incorporated elements that contrast with the concept of hegemonic masculinity in Mexico, which he believes have been propagated by the culture industry. In an interview with Imagen Televisión, Cháirez described such masculine figures as hypermasculine and white. He explained that Zapata was not his original focus when conceiving the work, but the image ultimately took that form.

Researcher Marco Antonio Soto Rodríguez said that in La Revolución, Zapata is exhibited in a delicate pose, and the horse appears to embody masculinity transferred from the man and amplified in the animal. Scholars Nivardo Trejo Olvera and Silvia Ruiz Tresgallo compare the man's pose to that of a pin-up model, noting his expression of satisfaction and the upward tilt of his buttocks, which they interpret as suggesting a desire to be penetrated. Academic Citlaly Aguilar Campos reaches a similar conclusion, writing that his closed eyes and the way he brushes his cheeks against his shoulders convey a sense of pleasure.

== Exhibition ==
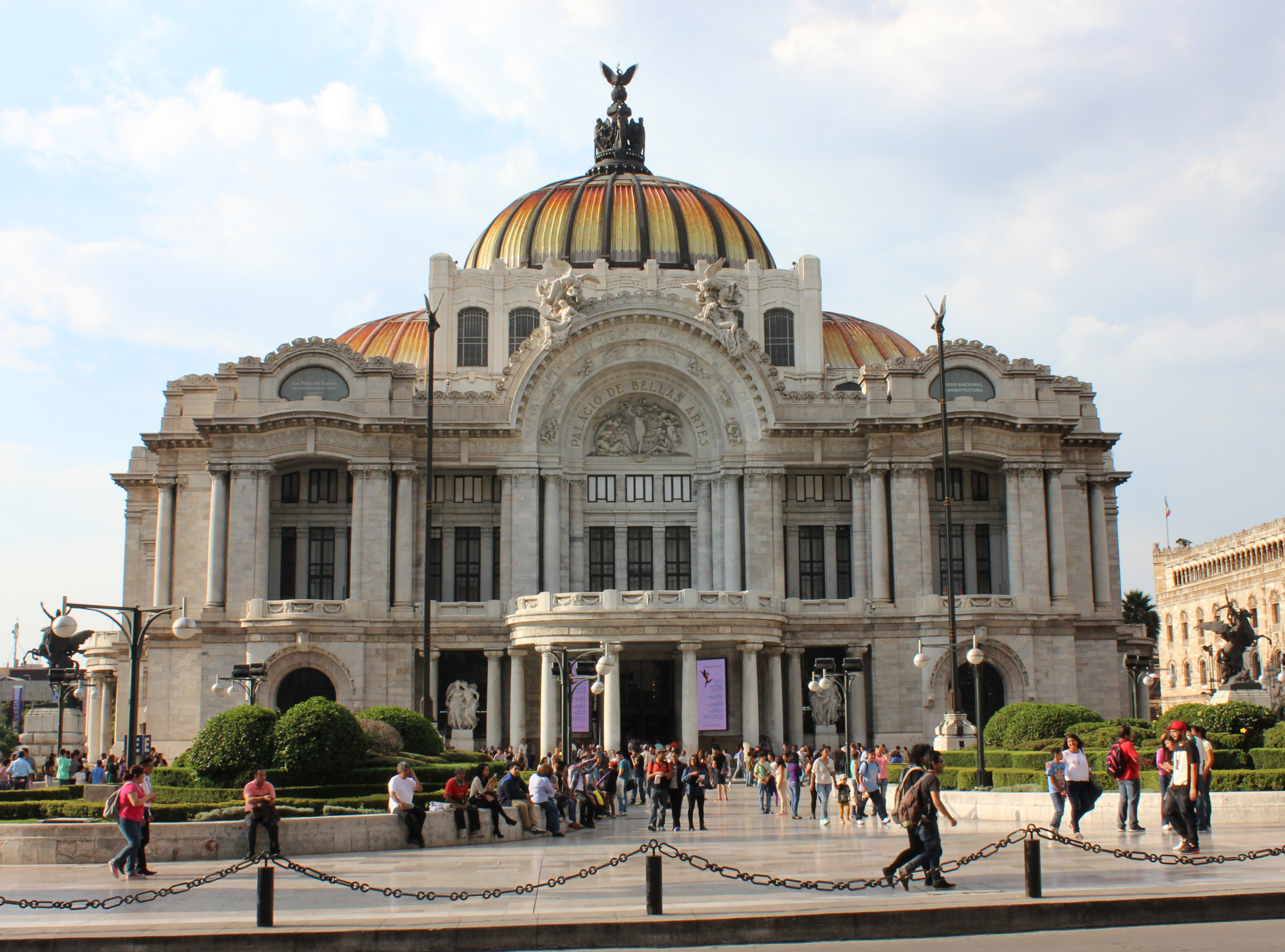
The Palacio de Bellas Artes, where La Revolución was exhibited as part of an art show in 2019 and 2020.

La Revolución was exhibited at the Galería José María Velasco in Mexico City in 2015 and 2016. A mural of the painting is also featured at El Marrakech, an LGBTQ bar. There, the curator of the Museum of the Palacio de Bellas Artes first learned about Cháirez's work, after which Cháirez was invited to present at the museum. The exposition Emiliano. Zapata después de Zapata, organized by the National Institute of Fine Arts and Literature (INBAL) between 2019 and 2020, opened on 26 November 2019 at the museum in Mexico City, and ended on 16 February 2020. The exhibition featured photographs, paintings, various contemporary and modern images, as well as essays that explored the memory of Zapata. La Revolución was chosen as the promotional poster for the event. Some of the works portrayed Zapata as Speedy Gonzales, others as a man wearing an apron, who traded his rifle for a broom and a box of detergent. A scene from the 1952 film Viva Zapata! was also played.

The representation of Zapata, commonly regarded as a masculine figure, with feminine traits in La Revolución, challenged the hegemonic perception of his masculinity. It sparked debates across various platforms, initially on social networking services and mass media outlets, and later in public spaces, creating two opposing camps: one supporting the artwork and the other opposing it. On one side, supporters of Cháirez advocated for freedom of expression. On the other hand, critics considered the depiction of Zapata as feminine or homosexual to be offensive to his memory. For Soto Rodríguez, the omission of other caricatures of Zapata in the discussion suggested that the issue was not the alteration of his appearance or the adoption of clothing associated with traditional female stereotypes, but rather the implication of homosexuality.

On 10 December 2019, one contingent of demonstrators, mainly consisting of peasants and members of labor organizations, called for the painting's removal from the museum, arguing that it tarnished both Zapata's image and that of the cultural center itself. This group was opposed by counter-protesters who supported the painting, many of whom were members of the LGBTQ community. The painting's opponents attacked physically and shouted homophobic chants at its supporters. Cháirez expressed surprise, as he believed that Mexican society had progressed on such issues. President Andrés Manuel López Obrador condemned any hate crimes and called for respect and tolerance. Alejandro Castro compared the controversy to that sparked by Juan Davila's 1994 painting The Liberator Simón Bolívar, in which the military officer is depicted with a pronounced feminine keyhole neckline.

Jorge Zapata, Emiliano's grandson, said that his family would take legal action against Cháirez and the INBAL, as they believed that the artwork diminished the image of Emiliano. The authorities reached an agreement with the family to install an informational disclaimer plaque next to the painting:

"For some contemporary artists, Zapata is not only a symbol of resistance but also a reference point from which to challenge hegemonic masculinities. In this oil painting, Fabián Cháirez redefines an icon of Mexican machismo to highlight sexual diversity, particularly homosexual, brown-skinned, effeminate bodies from the working class that do not fit within the norm. Cháirez's La Revolución links Zapata's legacy with the struggles of the LGTB+ community, reclaiming femininity as a revolutionary attitude amid a homophobic and misogynistic society in the 21st century. Descendants of Emiliano Zapata expressed their disagreement with this image, considering the representation of Zapata inappropriate. Through dialogue between the authorities of the Secretariat of Culture and INBAL, the Museo del Palacio de Bellas Artes will retain the artwork, based on the principle of protecting the right to artistic and creative freedom". (Note: Original text: "Para algunos artistas contemporáneos, Zapata no sólo es símbolo de resistencia sino también un referente desde el cual cuestionar las masculinidades hegemónicas. En este óleo, Fabián Cháirez, resignifica un icono del machismo mexicano para visibilizar la diversidad sexual, particularmente cuerpos homosexuales, morenos, afeminados y de clase popular que no encajan dentro de la norma. La Revolución de Cháirez vincula el legado zapatista con las luchas de la población LGTB+, reivindicando la feminidad como una actitud revolucionaria en medio de una sociedad homofóbica y misógina en pleno siglo XXI. Descendientes de Emiliano Zapata expresaron su desacuerdo con esta imagen, por considerar inadecuada la representación de Zapata. Mediante el diálogo entre autoridades de la Secretaría de Cultura y el INBAL, el Museo del Palacio de Bellas Artes mantendrá la obra, basándose en el principio de la protección al derecho de libertad artística y creativa".)

A few days before the exhibition ended, the Spanish journalist Tatxo Benet purchased the painting amid the surrounding controversy and later exhibited it in the Censored Art Collection at the Museu de l'Art Prohibit (Museum of Forbidden Art), in Barcelona, Spain. He decided to buy it because it "breaks the myth of Mexican masculinity and has provoked outrage among peasants, who see Zapata as an idol".

== Reception ==
Aguilar Campos discusses La Revolución in a 2021 research paper, exploring how the figure of the national hero can be reinterpreted through alternative perspectives that challenge traditional narratives, official discourses, and dominant cultural values. She describes the artwork as a satirical representation, drawing comparisons to a caricature. Aguilar Campos reflects on Jorge Zapata's interpretation of the painting: he believed it portrayed his grandfather as gay, even though the artwork includes no text or direct reference to the LGBTQ community. She argues that this response echoes what American philosopher Charles Sanders Peirce described as semiosis: a phenomenon in which signs do not function in isolation but generate meaning through a network of interpretants that shifts based on spatial and temporal context. She concludes that La Revolución aims not to depict Zapata or a conventional national hero, but rather to create a new symbol whose meaning is understood by the viewer.

In a 2021 article, Trejo Olvera and Ruiz Tresgallo present an anthology of Mexico-based artists who explore alternative representations of masculinity from a dissident perspective. Through a critical lens, the authors analyze how national culture has constructed and reinforced traditional notions of manliness, noting that the Palacio de Bellas Artes displays murals and paintings by Diego Rivera, José Clemente Orozco, David Alfaro Siqueiros and Jorge González Camarena, all cisgender heterosexual men whose works present binary renditions of people and omit sexual diversity.

Researchers Úrsula Albo Cos and José Luis Sánchez Ramírez wrote an article focused on how La Revolución was received by the Internet culture through memes. Their study highlights several memes posted online that contrast La Revolución's negative reception with society’s frequent dismissal of issues like rape, discrimination, and femicide. They also explore how the artwork has been incorporated into memes based on Mexican cultural elements, including its appearance in a meme depicting the cover of a freely-distributed primary school textbook and in a meme depicting it as a replacement for the pictogram at the Zapata metro station in Mexico City. For the authors, the images allow an analysis of Zapata's historical perception, adding that "the mockery stems from the social significance of imagining a feminized Zapata", which leads to "a perceived need to 'correct' it through comedy via memes".

Soto Rodríguez posits that La Revolución restarted existing rumors regarding Zapata's sexuality, which he notes coincided with high levels of gender-related violence in Mexico. Renato González Mello argues that the artwork relies on the concept of decorum in a satirical way, embellishing a historical figure to highlight the absurdity of traditional ideals. Regarding the controversy, art critic Avelina Lésper said, "You know what I find controversial? That they hung such a bad painting".

== See also ==
- LGBTQ culture in Mexico City
