= Statue of Emiliano Zapata, Cholula =

Statue in Cholula, Puebla, Mexico

Statue of Emiliano Zapata
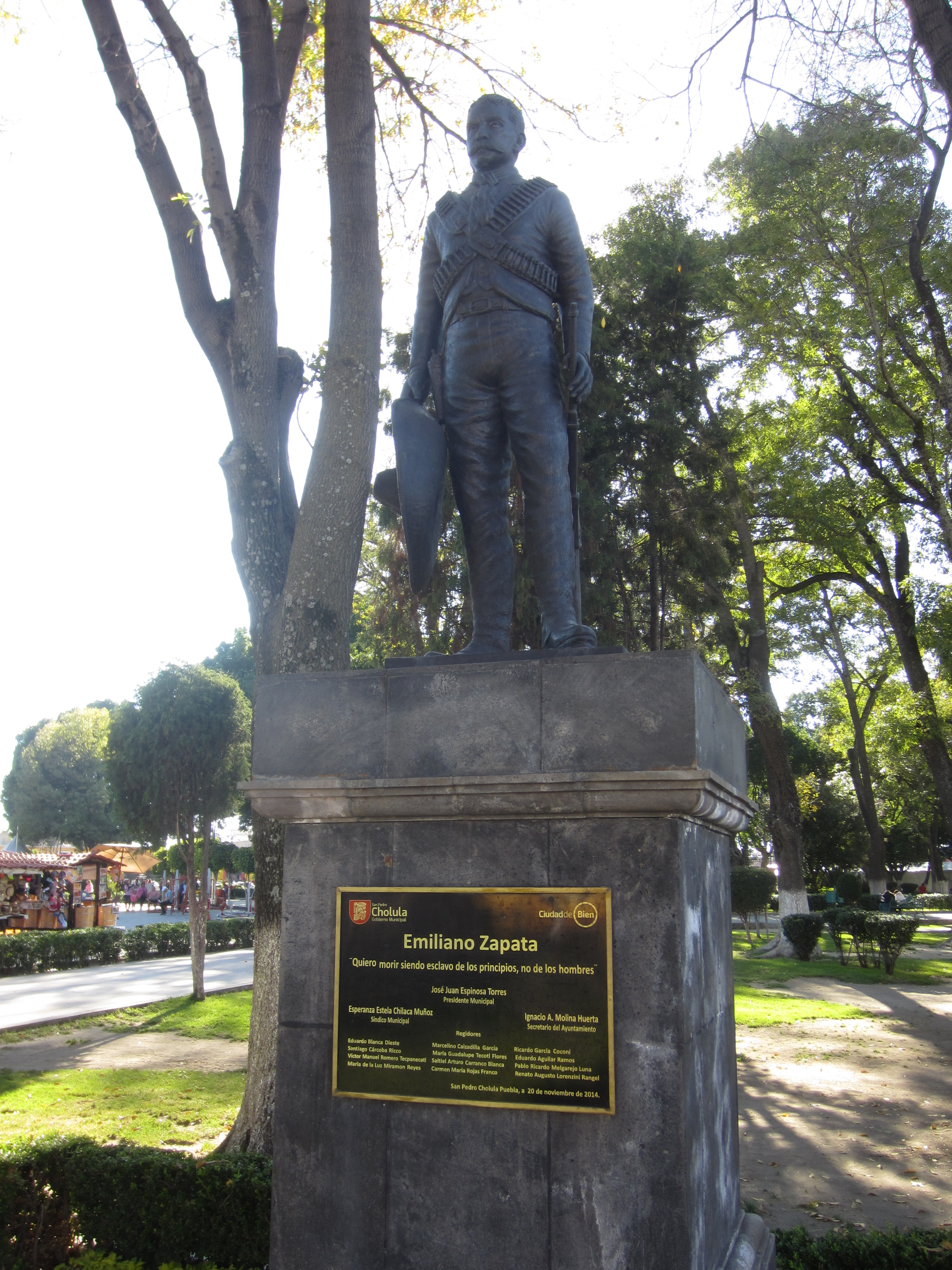
- The statue in 2018
- Subject: Emiliano Zapata
- Location: Cholula, Puebla, Mexico; 19°3′46.5″N 98°18′19.9″W

The statue of Emiliano Zapata in Cholula, Puebla, Mexico, was erected by Gobierno Municipal de San Pedro Cholula in 2014.

== See also ==
- Cultural depictions of Emiliano Zapata
