= Tatxo Benet =

Spanish businessman

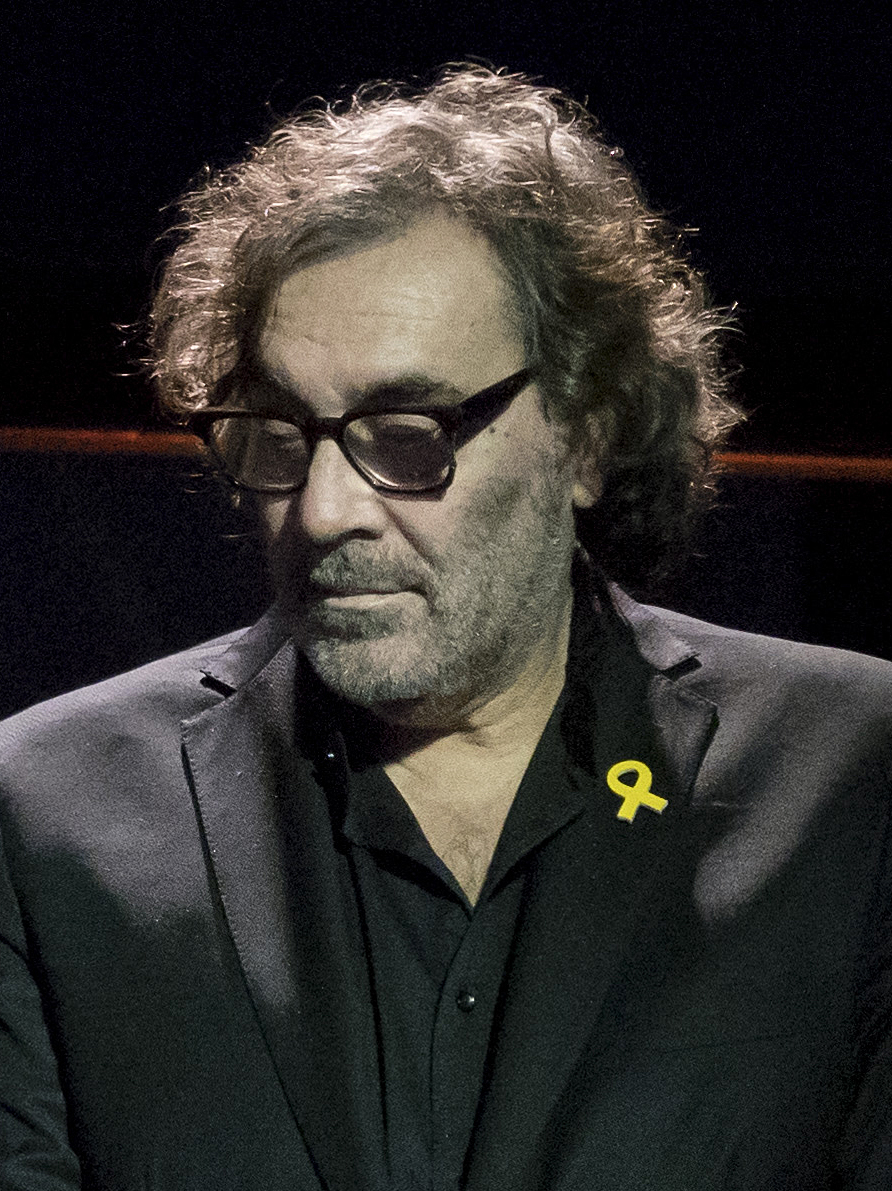
- Benet in 2018
- Born: Josep Maria Benet Ferran; 14 June 1957 (age 69); Lleida, Catalonia, Spain
- Occupation: Businessman
- Known for: Mediapro
- Spouse: Camino Quiroga (m. 2016)

Josep Maria Benet Ferran (born 14 June 1957), better known as Tatxo Benet, is a Spanish journalist and businessman.

== Biography ==
He studied law (University of Barcelona in Lleida) and Information Sciences (Universitat Autònoma de Barcelona), although he never graduate from either degree, combining his university studies with a budding career in journalism.

Benet began his professional career in 1975 in El Diario de Lérida as a staff writer for local news and sports. In December 1976, he moved to Barcelona to participate in the launch of the newspaper Catalunya Express as a reporter for the Sports section. In June 1977 he returned to Lleida as a correspondent for the national daily El País and from November 1978, working as a delegate for El Periódico de Catalunya.

In September 1980, Tatxo made what was to be his definitive move to Barcelona to work at El Periódico as editor of Las Cosas de la Vida, being appointed chief-editor of the section in the spring of 1982.

In September 1983, he joined the founding team of TV3-Televisió de Catalunya with the position of head of the News Department's Catalonia section. It was here that Tatxo first met Jaume Roures and Gerard Romy. In January 1984, as TV3 began regular broadcasting, Tatxo was appointed Head of News Assignments. Since then, and for the next fifteen years until 1997, Tatxo Benet was responsible for a variety of areas and held several managerial positions at Televisió de Catalunya.

He presented and directed news section in several newscasts, and directed and presented Tothom per tothom magazine.

In June 1987, Tatxo was appointed Head of the Sports Department, a position he held for almost ten years, until September 1996. During the period he was Head of Sports, and along with Jaume Roures, TV3 acquired the rights and exclusive broadcasting in Catalonia for the Spanish La Liga and the Copa del Rey, UEFA Champions League, Wimbledon and US Open tennis tournaments, the four Grand Slam golf tournaments: British Open, US Open, Augusta Masters and USPGA, as well as many other top-level Spanish and international competitions, breaking the monopoly held by Spanish Televisión Española up to this point. During this period, the appearance and content of sports programming underwent significant modernization, as well as the way networks utilized different sporting footage and images. In fact, TV3's Channel 33 was soon transformed into a sports channel given the quality and volume of broadcasts and sports programs the channel featured, especially at weekends. During the 1992 Barcelona Olympic Games Tatxo was appointed director and Head of Canal Olímpic, broadcasting the games in Catalan 24 hours a day.

With the creation of FORTA, the Federación de Organismos de Radio y Televisión Autonómica, which brings together all the regional autonomous TV and radio networks in Spain, Tatxo was appointed Coordinator and Head of the Sports Division.

In January 1997, Tatxo moved to Madrid and was appointed General Director of Audiovisual Sport, a company participated by Sogecable (40%), Antonio Asensio (40%) and Televisió de Catalunya (20%), which was set up to commercialize the media rights to the Spanish Football League.

In the summer of 1997, Antonio Asensio sold their stake in Audiovisual Sport to Telefónica, who had just launched its Via Digital platform. This operation brought about a standoff in the company, given that the two majority shareholders (Sogecable and Telefónica) held conflicting positions.

Faced with this situation, in September 1997, Tatxo resigned from his position and returned to Barcelona. Once there, Benet decided to set up his own company to produce and distribute rights, a company that was to merge with Mediapro, which had been set up some years earlier by Jaume Roures and Gerard Romy.

== Contemporary art collection and patronage ==
In February 2018 he started his contemporary art collection, which he has titled "Censored." It consists of more than seventy artworks that were censored at some point in history. The collection includes works by Abel Azcona, Ai Weiwei, Francisco de Goya, Robert Mapplethorpe and Andres Serrano.

In February 2018, shortly before it was withdrawn from Arco, Tatxo Benet acquired the piece Presos políticos en la España contemporánea (lit. 'Political Prisoners in Modern-day Spain') by Santiago Sierra. Outraged by what he considers “an act of intolerable censorship,” he made the piece available to anyone who wishes to exhibit it, with the Museum in Lleida being its first destination, and from where the works of the Sixena Monastery had recently been removed. The work has been shown in more than thirty cities in Spain, and in several European countries.

One of the most important pieces in Tatxo Benet's Contemporary Art collection is Amen or The Pederasty by Abel Azcona, which was censored and persecuted by the Catholic Church, as well as Piss Christ by Andres Serrano and photographs by Ai Weiwei, which are considered to be some of the most recognized censored artworks in art history.

In January 2020, Benet bought a nude, feminized painting of Mexican Revolutionary General Emiliano Zapata, La Revolución by Fabián Cháirez. Descendants of Zapata sued Cháirez for defamation after the painting was exhibited at the Palacio de Bellas Artes in Mexico City. The painting was to be taken to Cataluña for exhibition alongside 25 other controversial paintings in Benet's collection.

In 2019, Tatxo acquired the bookshop llibreria Ona from Montse Úbeda. The bookstore had dedicated over half a century to literature in Catalan and is scheduled to reopen its doors to customers in the center of Barcelona in time for Sant Jordi 2020.

Andorran politician Rosa Gili Casals ordered that a piece of his artwork was removed from an exhibition on the grounds of national security. The artwork in question featured a cover of the Charlie Hebdo magazine and "all is forgiven". It was part of his exhibition at the Espai Caldes museum in Andorra and the whole exhibition was eventually closed. Rosa Gili confirmed the support for freedom of expression but the security concerns were paramount.
