= Palace of Cortés, Cuernavaca =

Palace in Cuernavaca, Mexico

Coordinates: 18°55′16.82″N 99°14′0.15″W

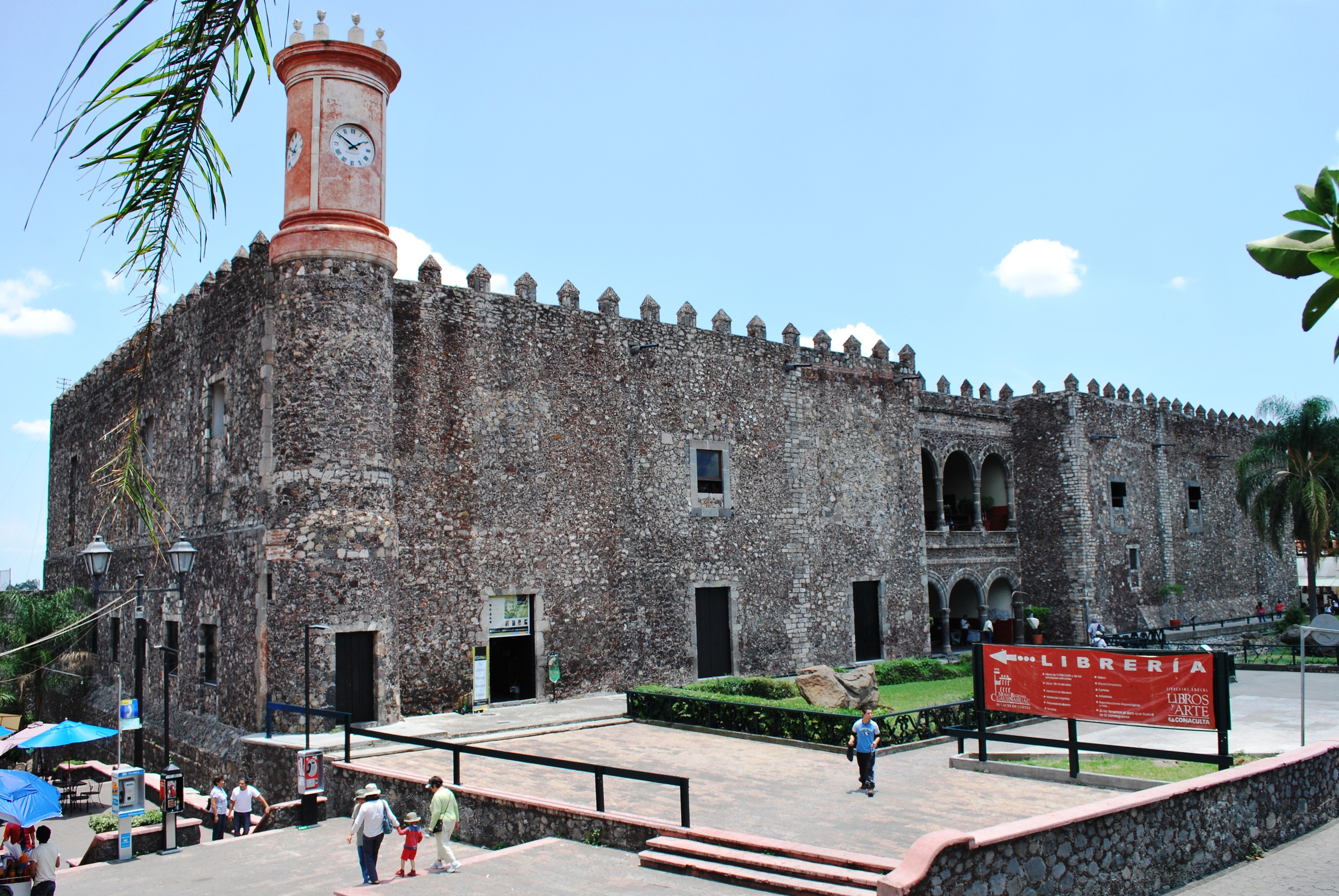
Palace built in Cuernavaca by Indians in the service of Hernán Cortés, which for many years was seen as a symbol of Spanish rule over the natives of ancient Mesoamerica.

The Palace of Cortés (Spanish: Palacio de Cortés) in Cuernavaca, Mexico, built between 1531 and 1535, is the oldest conserved colonial-era civil structure in the continental Americas. The architecture is a blend between Gothic and Mudéjar, typical of the early 16th century colonial architecture. The building began as a fortified residence for conqueror Hernán Cortés and his aristocratic second wife, Doña Juana Zúñiga. It was built in 1526, over a Tlahuica Aztec tribute collection center, which was destroyed by the Spanish during the Conquest. Cortés replaced it with a personal residence to assert authority over the newly conquered peoples. As Cortés's residence, it reached its height in the 1530s, but the family eventually abandoned it due to on-going legal troubles. In the 18th century, colonial authorities had the structure renovated and used it as barracks and jail. During the Mexican War of Independence, it held prisoners such as José María Morelos y Pavón. After the war, it became the seat of government for the state of Morelos until the late 20th century, when the state government moved out and the structure was renovated and converted into the Museo Regional Cuauhnahuac, or regional museum, with exhibited on the history of Morelos.

After suffering severe damage caused by the 2017 Puebla earthquake, it remained closed for restoration work until March 30, 2023, when it reopened as the Museo Regional de los Pueblos de Morelos, or Regional Museum of the People’s of Morelos (MRPM).

== History ==
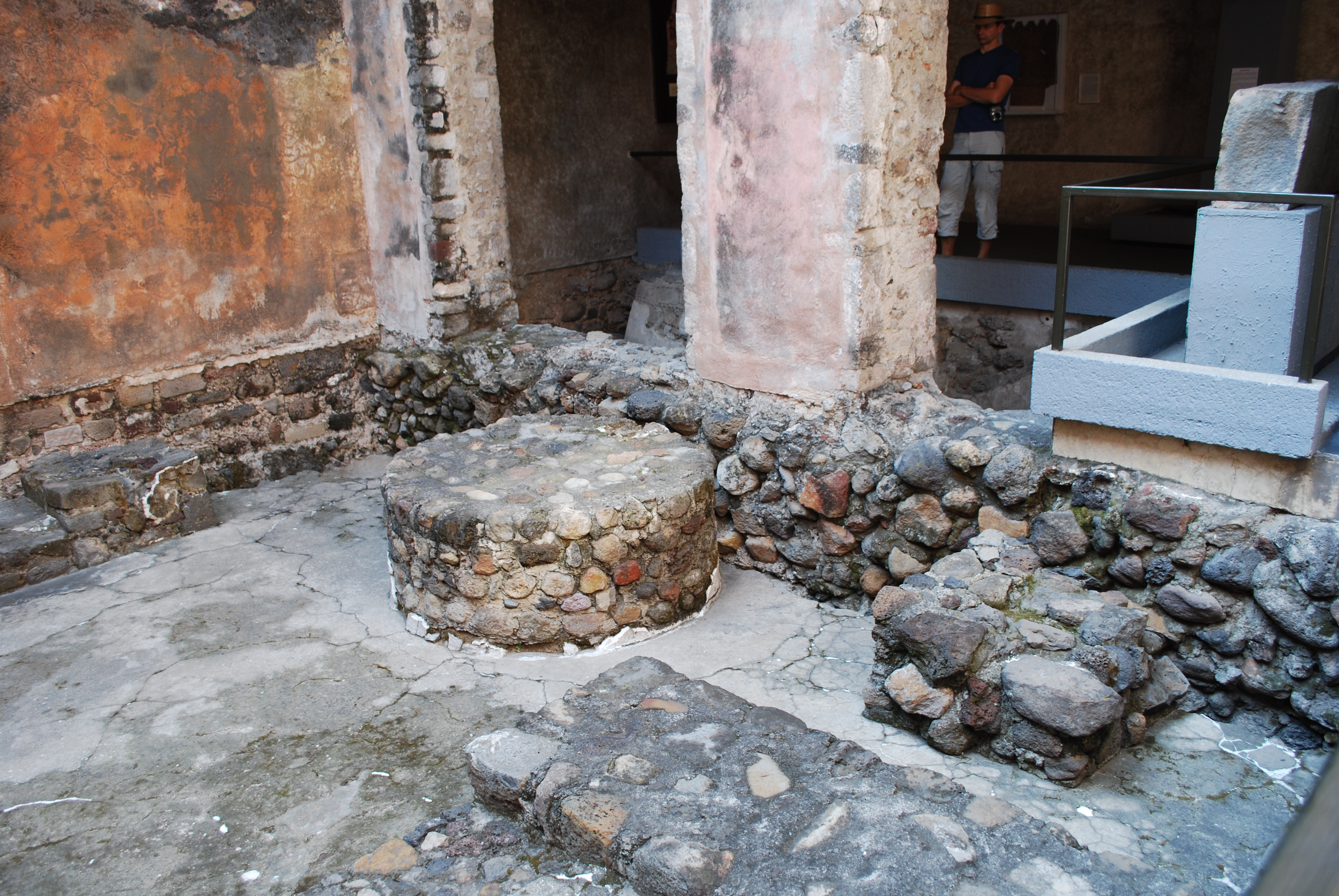
Interior courtyard with pre-Hispanic ruins in evidence

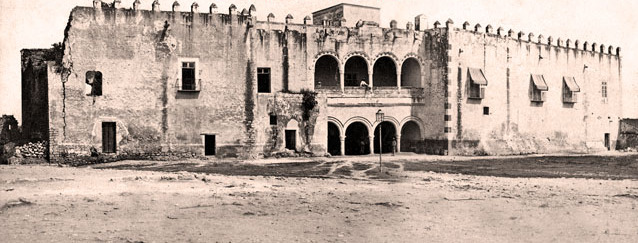
Palace of Cortés in 1878.

On the site of this palace a tribute gathering place originally stood, first for Tlahuican rulers, then (after they conquered what is now Morelos in the 15th century) for the Aztecs.

In 1526, shortly after the Spanish conquest of the Aztec Empire, the conquistador Hernando Cortés had the pre-Hispanic building destroyed and a palace for himself built in its place. Cortés had chosen Cuernavaca for this residence because of the fertility of the lands surrounding it.

Much smaller than the building today (the central part of the extant structure, marked by the use of arches on the balconies, corresponds to Cortés's construction), the original palacio was erected as a fortress, with thick walls, merlons, and other defensive elements, and held its own armory stocked with arquebusses, muskets, cannon, and other weapons. Nevertheless, most of the building was to serve as a residence, supported by mill, stables, gardens, ovens, and more. The main body of the palace was erected with two galleries on the west side containing four arches in each of its two levels; living quarters were built on the north and south sides. A watchtower was added when Cortés was named the Captain General and Governor of New Spain . Befitting the conqueror of Mexico and the Marquess of the Valley of Oaxaca, Cortés had his residence furnished and decorated richly; the walls were covered with twenty one tapestries, the chapel contained crosses and other religious items in gold and silver.

Due to attacks from the newly conquered people, Cortés had a genuine need for protection. During one of his visits to the palace, he was attacked by Tlahuican warriors who tried to kill him at the place now called the Callejón del Diablo ("Devil’s Alley"). The attack is documented, though a later legend is not: it proclaims that Cortés reached safety by jumping a five-meter-wide crevice on his horse, Rucio.

View of the palace

Cortés brought his second wife, Doña Juana de Zúñiga, to live at the palace, where she stayed until after Cortés death in 1547. Their son and heir, Don Martín Cortés, 2nd Marqués del Valle de Oaxaca was born at this palace, but the conquistador himself did not spend much time here. Instead, he spent most of his time after the conquest organizing expeditions, building ships on the Pacific coast, touring his encomienda holdings as marquess, and introducing such crops as sugar cane with success. Cortés had three haciendas in the area around Cuernavaca and eventually spent most of his time in Morelos at one or another of these, especially at Atlacomulco.

As Cortés's residence, the importance of the building reached its height in the 1530s, when Cortés visited it frequently. The first expansion was made between 1531 and 1535, when Cuernavaca was made the administrative center of Cortés's domains. In 1540, Cortés traveled to Spain but could not return to Mexico; he died in Spain in 1547.

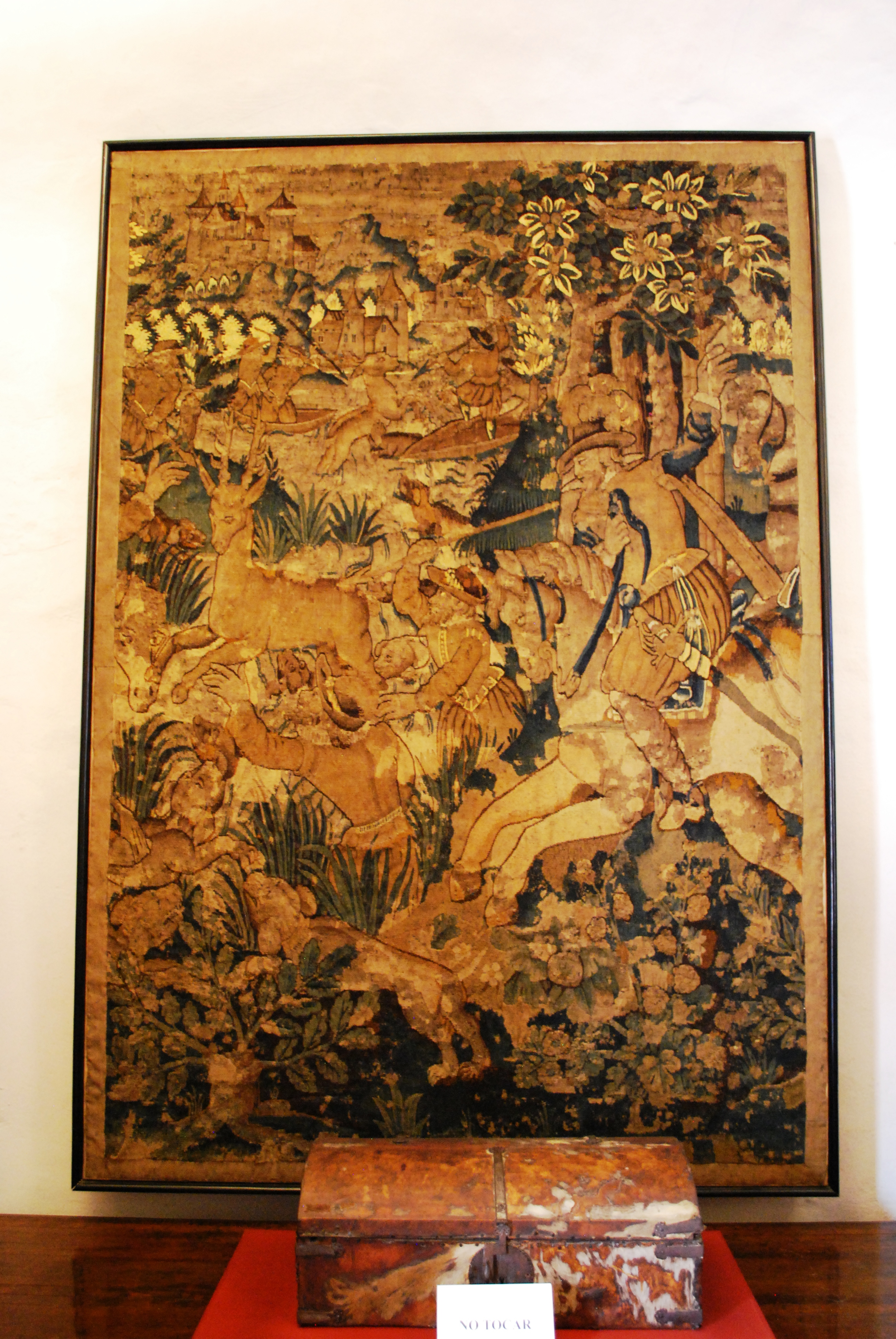
Colonial era tapestry depicting the Conquest of Mexico located in the Palace of Cortes

After Cortés's death, his son Don Martin, as the new Marquéz del Valle de Oaxaca, inherited this palace. From 1629 to 1747, the family gradually abandoned it, and the building was used as an ironworks, tannery, and textile workshop. In the mid 18th century, colonial authorities ordered the restoration of the then run-down building; three architects handled the design work, with Gregorio Cayteano Durán probably executing most of the work. After restoration, the government used the building as barracks and as a jail. During the Mexican War of Independence, the former palace housed famous prisoners, José María Morelos y Pavon and Ignacio López Rayón amongst them. Mayors of Cuernavaca may also have used part of the building as their official residence.

In 1855, the palacio was the site of the provisional government of the territory ruled by Mexican liberal Juan Álvarez as he fought against conservative Antonio López de Santa Anna. From 1864 to 1866, it served as a summer residence of Emperor Maximilian, who visited Cuernavaca frequently. In 1872, the palace was made the site of the state government of Morelos. In the same year, Governor Francisco Leyva expanded the north end and had the stairwell and other areas redone in a then-popular French style. The palace remained the seat of state government for about a century.

Because of time and the occasional earthquake, restorations were needed in the late 19th and early 20th centuries. One of its most characteristic elements of the palace, a fifteen-meter cylindrical tower on the northwest corner, was added during this period. Further repairs were made in the late 1920s. In 1930, Diego Rivera finished murals that decorate the arcade on the second floor. In 1949, a section for offices was added.

Between 1971 and 1973, the Department of Colonial Monuments of the Instituto Nacional de Antropología e Historia worked to recover the basic form of the sixteenth-century palace, using building techniques of that period and studying the archeology of the original sections. Modern materials were used to reinforce some sections.

== The museum ==
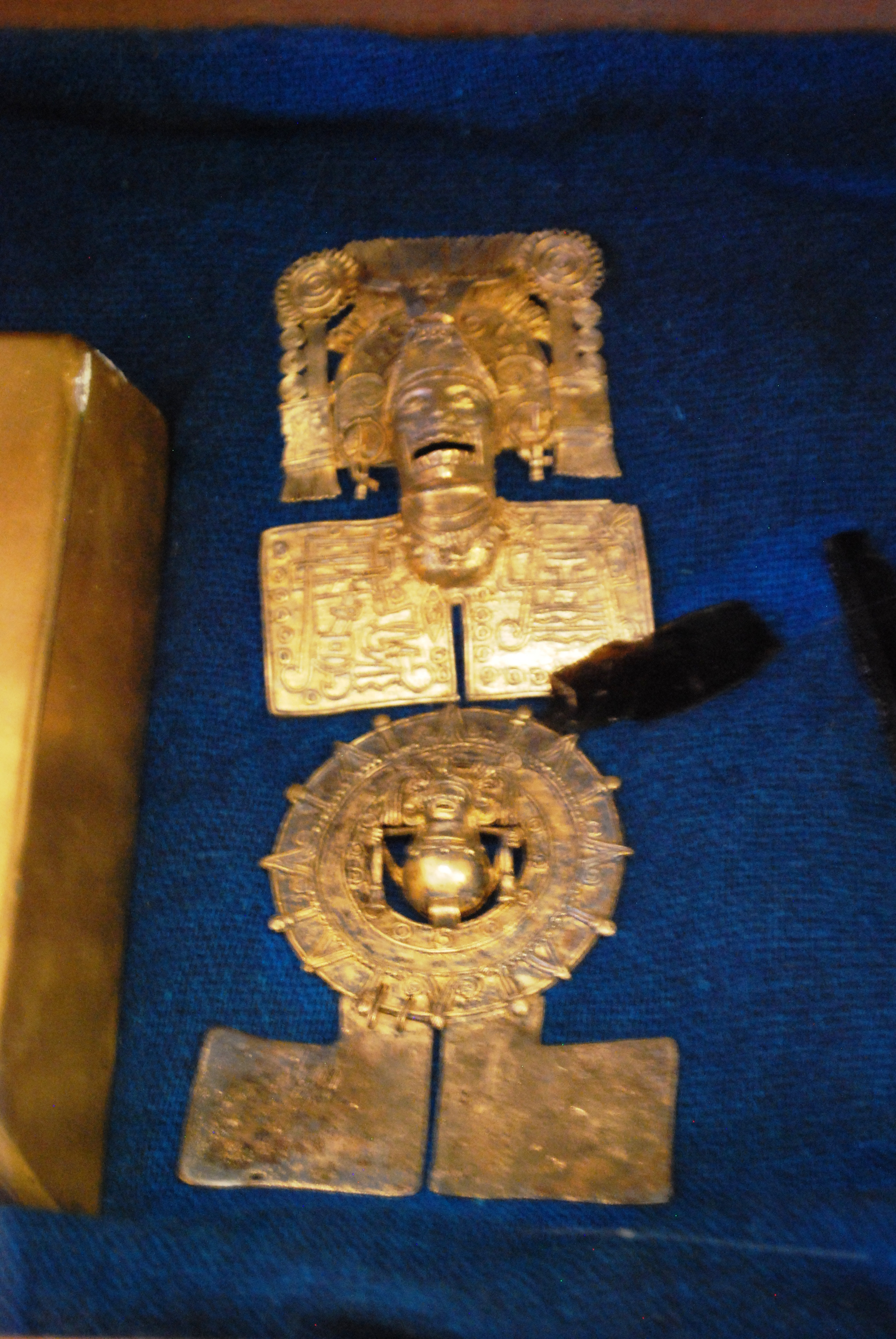
16th century Aztec gold ornament at the Palace of Cortés

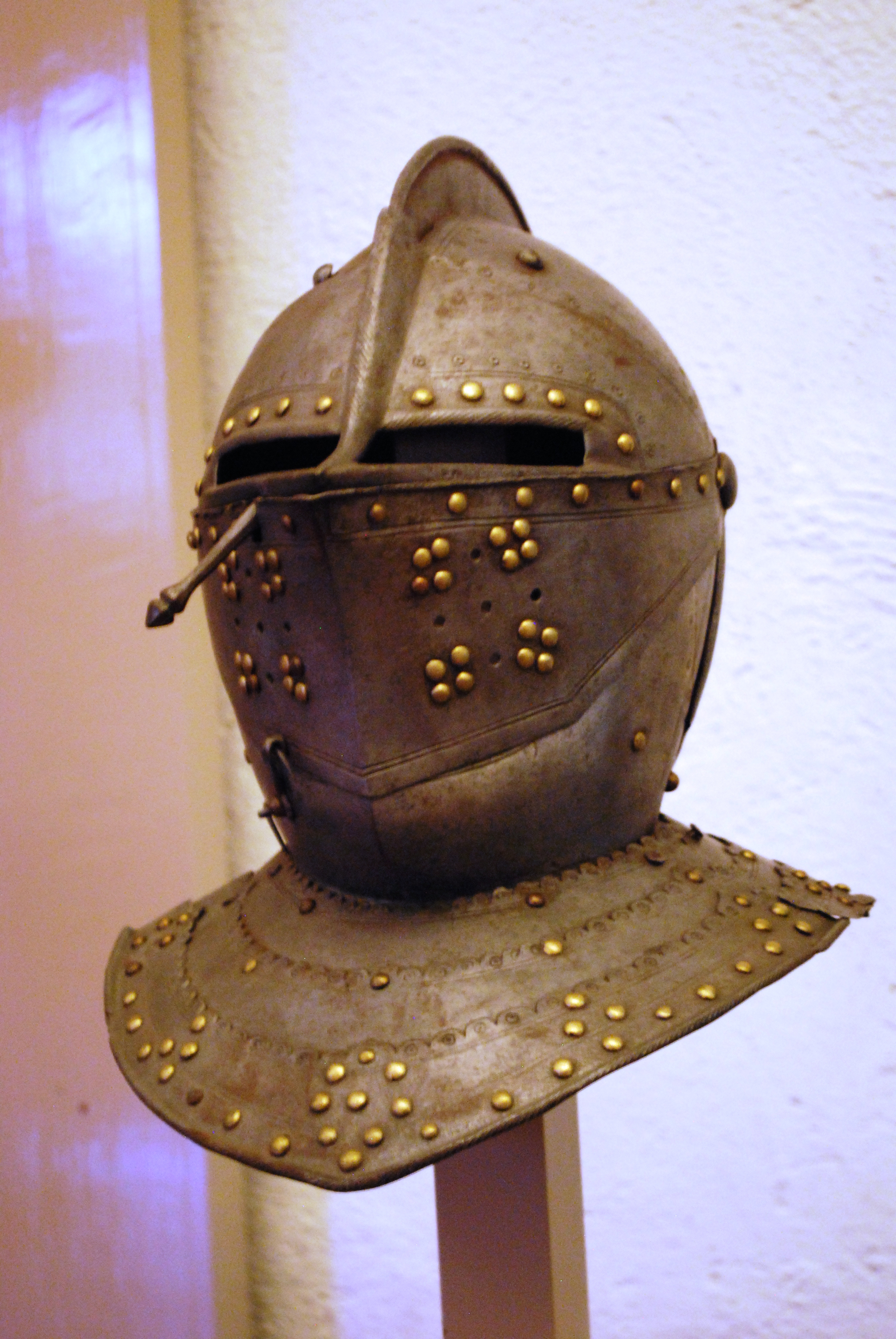
A 16th century Spanish helmet on display at the Palace of Cortés

After restoration work by the Instituto Nacional de Antropología e Historia (INAH) in the 1970s, the building was converted into the Museo Regional Cuauhnahuac, and on March 30, 2023 it reopened as the new Museo Regional de Los Pueblos de Morelos. It is one of many regional museums in Mexico, which are dedicated to local history and the role the region has played in Mexico's history. This museum is considered both a historical and archeological museum because of the collection, the building it is housed in, and the archeological site upon which it sits. The museum does not do conservation work on its collection, instead relying on the INAH in Morelos for this. Maintenance costs for the museum are high because specialized care is needed for both the collection and the building. However, much of the museum's budget is provided by INAH, especially for the building.

The museum has nineteen halls, which feature a collection of objects from the history of the state of Morelos, beginning with its earliest human settlers to the present day. Many of the rooms are devoted to prehistoric and pre-Hispanic era pieces from mammoth fossils to migration maps, to pottery and stone pieces. The most important Morelos archeological site covered is Xochicalco, though there are pieces from most of the state's Tlahuicas and Mexicas (Aztecs) sites. Rooms devoted to the colonial period are few in number but include religious items, items related to Hernán Cortés, and items concerning trade between Mexico and Asia. The post-independence period exhibit mostly relates to the continuance of the hacienda system, especially haciendas that produced sugar through the Porfirio Díaz period and the Mexican Revolution. There are also exhibits related to modern-day Morelos, particularly indigenous crafts and traditions.

On the second floor, there is a mural painted by Diego Rivera in 1930, the History of Morelos, Conquest and Revolution. The mural was restored and protective measures added in the 1990s, funded by private groups and the Centro Nacional de Conservación del Instituto Nacional de Bellas Artes. In the former Salón del Congreso (Congress Hall), there are works done by Salvador Tarajona in 1938.

== The colonial building ==
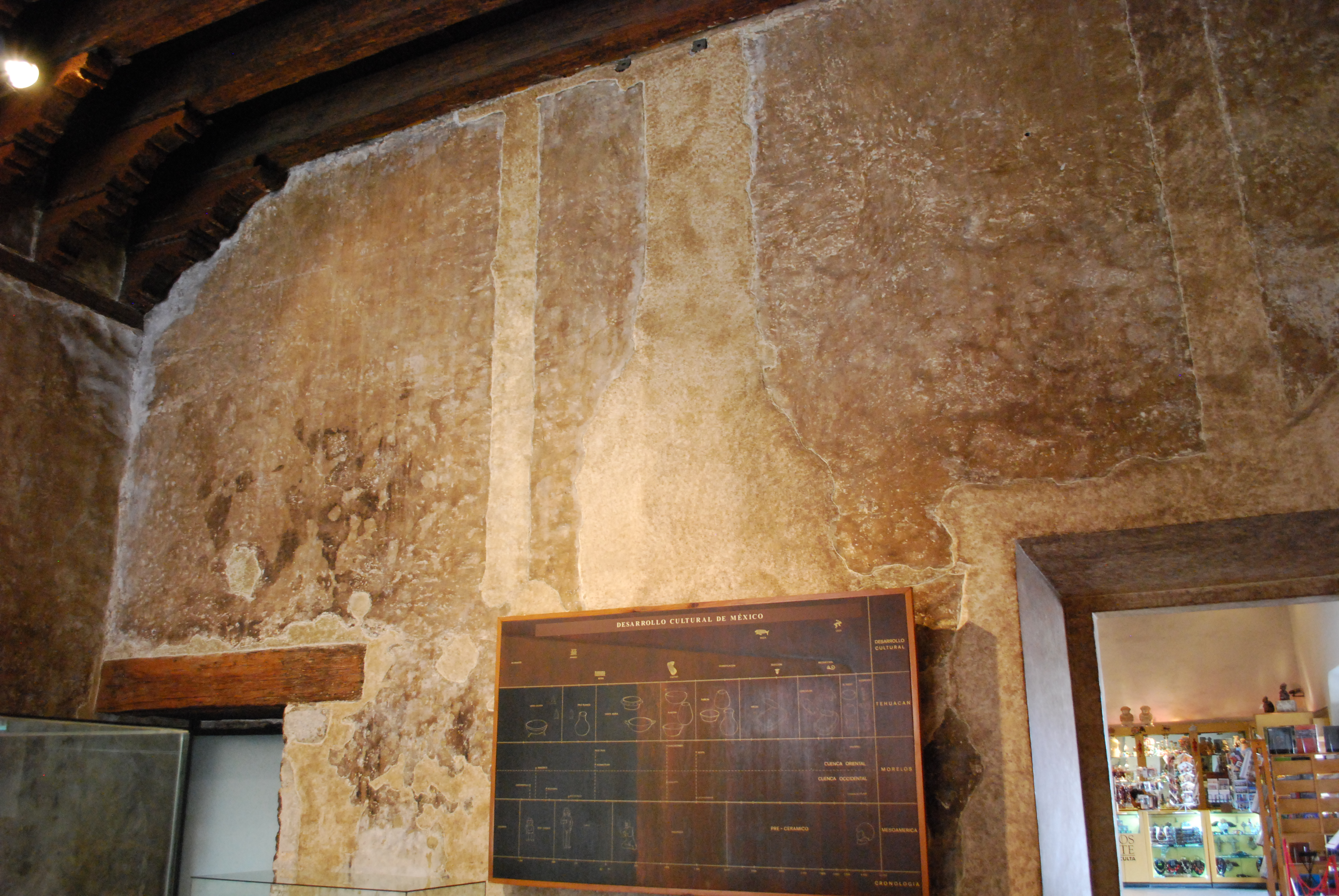
One of the interior walls of the building

The palace is located on a hill at the center of the city. It was built over the ruins of a "tlatlocayacalli," or place where tribute was collected beginning with Tlahuica rulers, then the Aztecs. The Spanish typically built their important structure over indigenous ones that were destroyed during the Conquest. However, most of Spanish constructions were churches. The palace is one of few civil constructions built for this purpose. The initial construction was small, four rooms surrounding a courtyard and bounded by arches. It is modeled after the Alcázar de Colón in Santo Domingo in the Dominican Republic .

Today, the enlarged building is the property of the federal government. It is listed by the INAH as in good condition—and at almost 500 years old, is the oldest preserved colonial era civil structure in Mexico. The building is made of local stone, using the old pre-Hispanic structure as a foundation. It contains merlons for defensive purposes, which was common for the era. There is a cylindrical tower on the northwest corner, but this was added in the late 19th century. Local lore states that there are underground passages between the palace and the cathedral complex. However, none have been found and similar stories are common in other parts of Mexico with large colonial structures.

== The archeological site ==
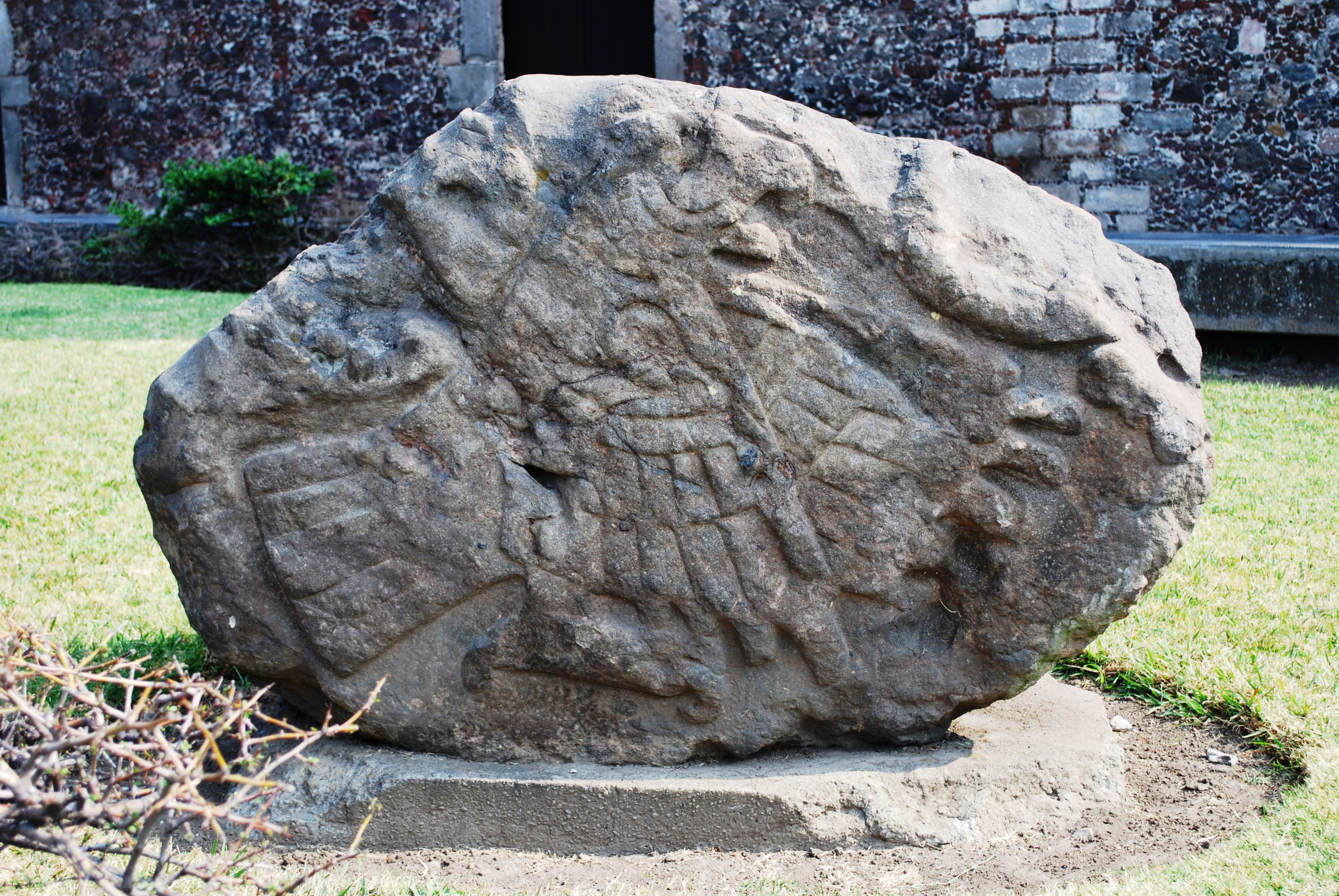
A carved stone before the palace

The Palace of Cortés archeological site extends from under the palace itself to the main square of the city. The palace was built over a "tlatlocayacalli" or place where tribute was collected beginning with the area's Tlahuica rulers and later the Aztecs. This tribute house was very likely extensive and luxurious as the then city-state was powerful. This function as a symbol of power prompted the Spanish to destroy it and replace it with a structure of their own. The old Tlahuica/Aztec structure is best seen in the areas in front of the current palace and in the courtyards of the same. It is one of the few Aztec era palaces that have been excavated by archeologists. However, little of the original building remains after it was destroyed by Cortés.

When the palace was renovated in the 1970s, archeological work, directed by Jorge Angulo Villaseñor, was done around and under the building. Through strategically placed wells, the project uncovered various walls, floors, burials and other elements from the Tlahuica to colonial eras. The best conserved areas are those in front of the building and in the interior courtyards. Important artifacts were recovered from the Teopanzolco period, under those from the Aztec period, both of which are covered by the colonial era building. These artifacts established the timeline of the Tlahuica period of Cuernavaca. Since then, more excavations have uncovered additional ruins.

== See also ==
- List of oldest buildings in the Americas
