= Fabián Cháirez =

Mexican visual artist (born 1987)

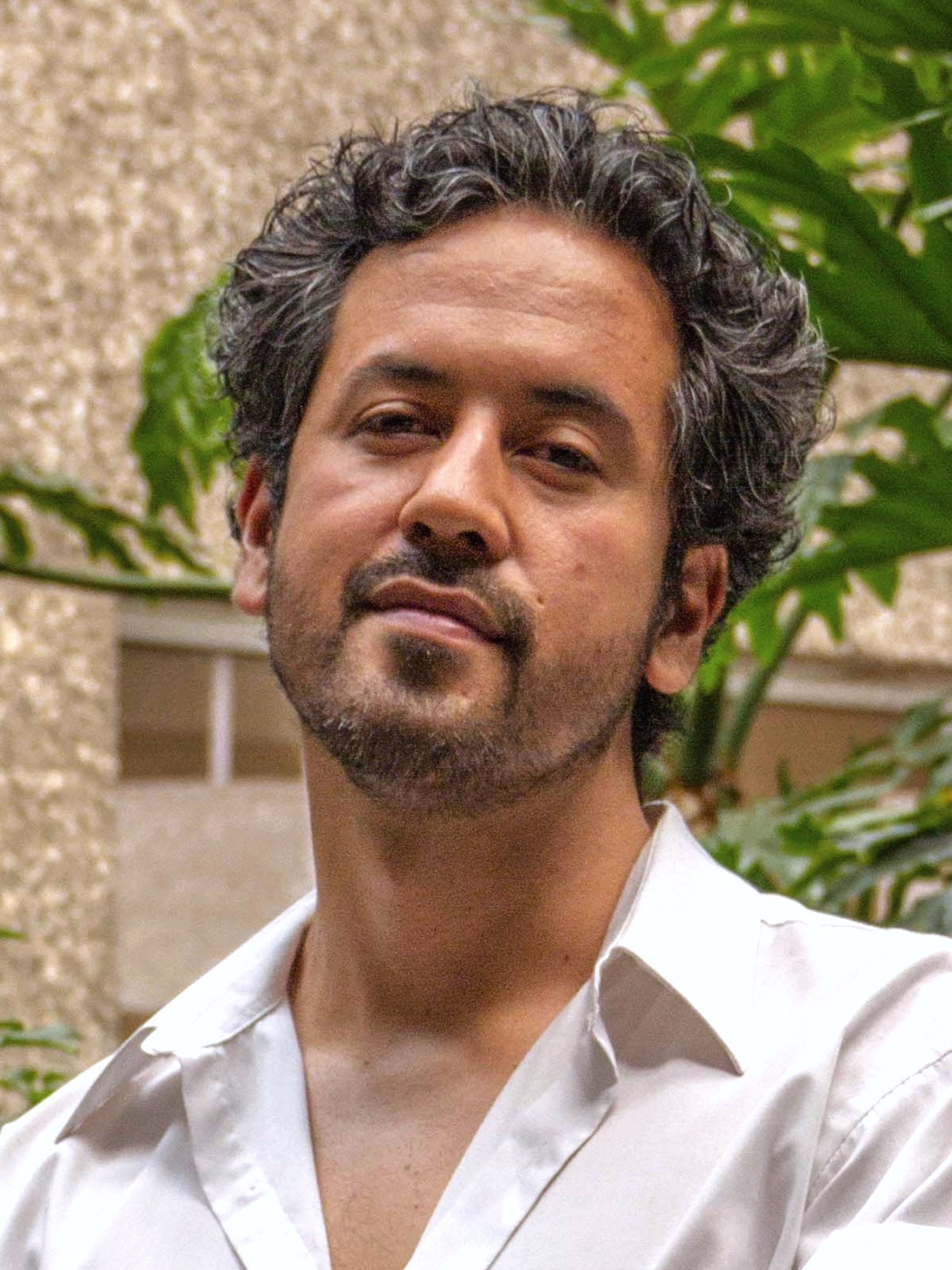
- Fabián Cháirez in April 2023
- Born: 13 December 1987 (age 38); Tuxtla Gutiérrez, Chiapas, México
- Education: University of Sciences and Arts of Chiapas (2007–2012)
- Known for: painting
- Notable work: La Revolución
- Website: fabianchairez.com

Fabián Cháirez (born 13 December 1987) is a Mexican plastic artist known for his paintings on sexuality and traditional masculinity (machismo). He is both a painter and sculptor. His work has been exhibited at the Museo del Palacio de Bellas Artes, Museo de Arte Moderno, and Museu de l'Art Prohibit. He has been based out of Mexico City since 2012.

Multiple paintings of his have caused controversy over their themes of queerness and the subversion of gender roles in contrast to their subjects, notably La Revolución and the works in his 2025 exhibit La venida del Señor.

== Life and career ==
Cháirez was born on 13 December 1987 in Tuxtla Gutiérrez, Chiapas, Mexico. His mother was a teacher, and he describes his father as being a charro. When he came out to his family, they took him to church, trying to change his sexuality. Before deciding to study art, he considered going into advertising. He attended the University of Sciences and Arts of Chiapas from 2007 to 2012, where he earned a degree in visual arts. He moved to Mexico City in 2012.

Cháirez says he became an artist as an escape, a way to embrace who he was and fight back. He points to a near-death experience he had around the age of 20 when he and his male partner were attacked with a knife as being important for his career development. The experience caused him to reflect on why and how people can hate others enough to kill them just because of who they are.

Early in his career, Cháirez painted murals, being involved with the graffiti scene in Chipas. His resin and fiber glass sculptures of legs, sometimes with penises, wearing high-heels are featured in LGBTQ bars throughout Mexico City; he dubbed them Tucked y untucked, in reference to tucking. In 2015, he was offered to display an individual exhibition at the José María Velasco Gallery in Tepito after the original artist had cancelled last minute.

He takes pride in keeping his art what he describes as "democratic", being accessible in contrast to the perceived elitism that exists within the traditional fine arts. He sells his work and merchandise with images of his works on his website. His work is influenced by Ángel Zárraga, Saturnino Herrán, and neomexicanismo, an art movement originating in the 1980s characterized by the frequent use of iconic Mexican imagery.

Cháirez created the painting used as cover art for Chilean-Mexican musician Mon Laferte's 2023 single "Tenochtitlán". He also does drag under the name María Magdalena, which was his grandmother's name.

== La Revolución ==
Cháirez's 30-by-20-centimetre (11.8 in × 7.9 in) oil painting La Revolución (lit. 'The Revolution'), created in 2014, depicts Mexican revolutionary Emiliano Zapata posing pin-up style wearing only a pink sombrero and high heels made of pistols astride an erect horse. The work was exhibited at Marrakech Salón, a bar in Mexico City.

The work's inclusion in a 2019 exhibition titled Emiliano: Zapata después de Zapata (lit. 'Emiliano: Zapata after Zapata') at the Palacio del Bellas Artes caused a national controversy. Its subversion of the traditional macho depictions of Zapata angered some, including the subject's descendants. Zapata's grandson, Jorge Zapata González, threatened to sue both the museum and Cháirez for defamation, claiming the work insinuated Zapata was gay and denigrated him. Cháirez also received death threats for the piece. On 10 December 2019, a group of around 200 protesters gathered at Bellas Artes, blocking its entrance and demanding that the work be removed or burned, some using homophobic slurs. Counterprotesters were also present, and the demonstrations ended in physical confrontations between the two sides. The museum promised to keep the work on display, regardless of any protests. President of Mexico Andrés Manuel López Obrador addressed the controversy at a press conference, rejecting the violence and the calls for the painting to be removed. The legal dispute between Jorge Zapata González and the museum was resolved, with the museum agreeing to remove the piece from any promotional materials and place a plaque next to the work expressing the Zapata family's disapproval of its content.

On 13 December 2019, Cháirez and around 300 supporters gathered at the Palacio, many dressed as feminine depictions of Zapata. During the protest Cháirez and the exhibition's curator Luis Vargas Santiago both expressed disapproval of the museum's concessions, but Cháirez also said that he understood the family,

I understand the anger of some because of an image that does not correspond to their expectations. I have felt rage when others have tried to impose an idea on me that does not fit with my way of thinking. This is something that many of us face every day, which is why with my painting I search for other possibilities of existing, of seeing and of interpreting reality.

In January 2020, the work was acquired by Spanish businessman and collector Tatxo Benet and put in his Colección de Arte Prohibido (lit. 'Collection of Prohibited Art').

The painting has become a symbol of struggle and pride for some in the Mexican LGBTQ community.

== La venida del Señor ==
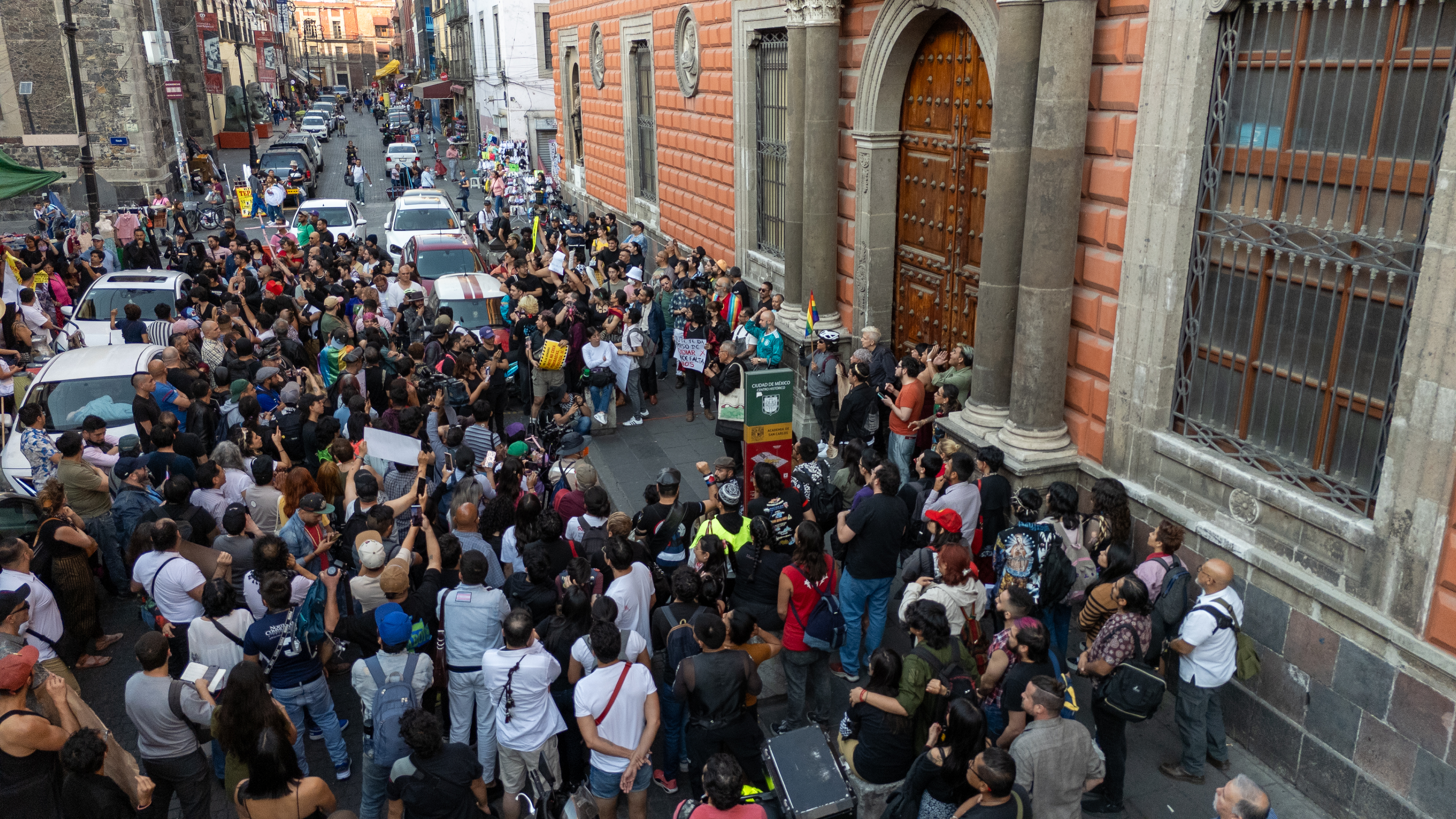
Protesters gather at the entrance of the Academy of San Carlos in support of Cháirez's exhibit La venida del Señor after it was suspended (7 March 2025)

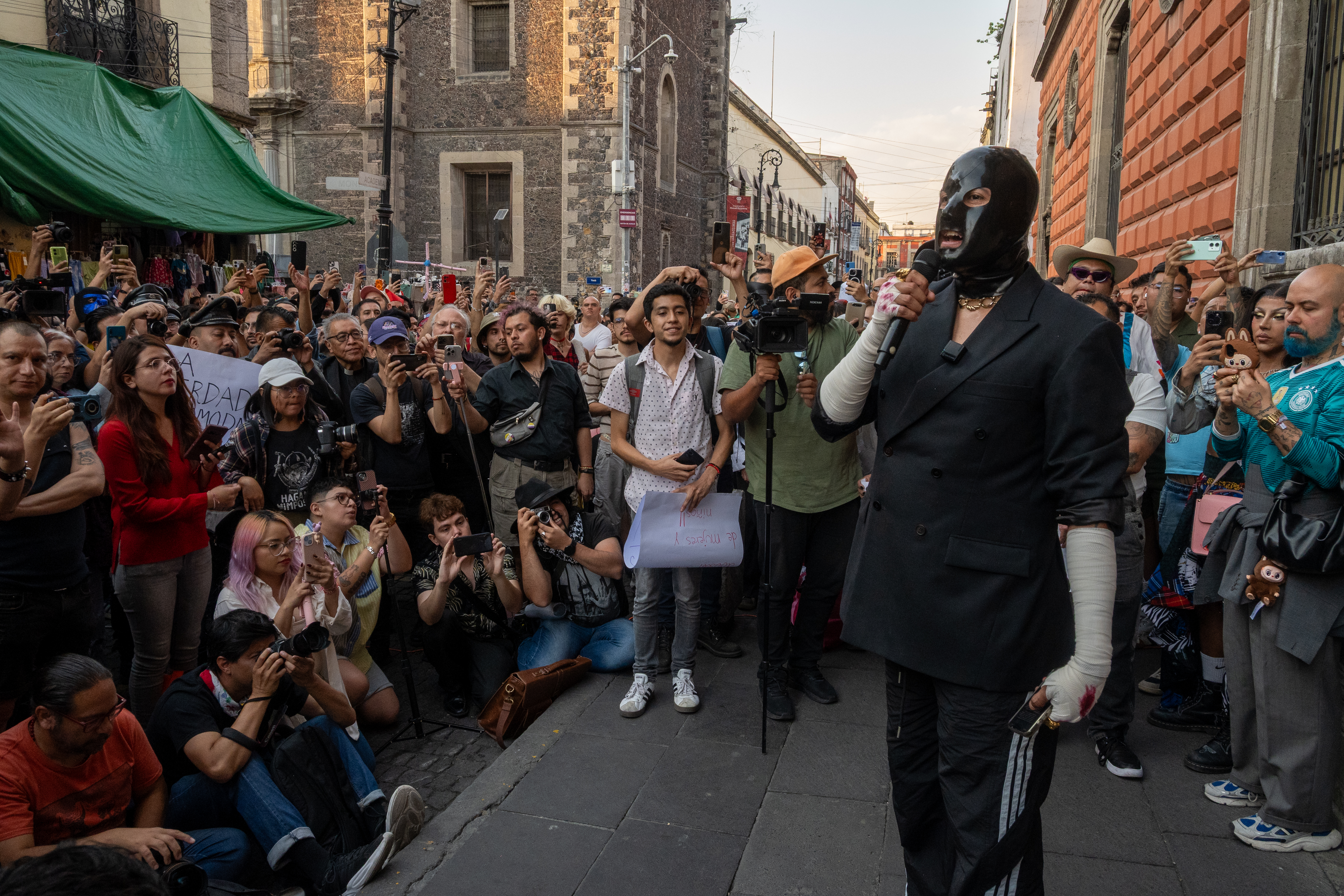
Cháirez (right) speaking to a crowd at the protest (7 March 2025)

Cháirez's 2025 exhibition La venida del Señor – lit. 'The Coming of the Lord': a double entendre that works in both languages – at the Academy of San Carlos of the National Autonomous University of Mexico (UNAM) was composed of nine large oil paintings created between 2018 and 2023. He stated that the works were produced to draw "comparison[s] between religious ecstasy and sexual ecstasy". Most of the paintings involved same-sex pairs fully clothed in traditional Catholic religious attire in homoerotic poses.

It faced backlash from some religious groups due to its religious subjects – nuns, priests, angels – and suggestive nature. The Association of Christian Lawyers (Asociación de Abogados Cristianos, AAC) filed a complaint against Cháirez with the National Council to Prevent Discrimination (CONAPRED), alleging his work violated the Mexican Constitution's Article 24 that protects religious freedom. On 14 February 2025, a group of Catholics disapproving of the works organized a sit-in in front of the San Carlos Academy. Five days later, protesters entered the building and staged a faux closure of a portion of the exhibit with caution tape and signs.

On 3 March 2025, federal judge Francisco Javier Rebolledo Peña granted the AAC a temporary suspension order against the exhibit, giving the UNAM 24 hours to enforce it. As a result, the show was suspended. A hearing was also set for 11 March to determine whether to grant a permanent suspension. Cháirez rebuked the suspension as censorship stemming from intolerance and called for protests in support of artistic freedom. He organized a demonstration on the university's campus on 7 March, where he spoke to a crowd of supporters.

On 13 March 2025, Rebolledo Peña rejected the AAC's request to indefinitely suspend the exhibit and Cháirez announced plans to open his exhibit again, possibly at other venues in Mexico City. On 2 April 2025, the exhibition was displayed at the Museum of Mexico City, where it was renamed La segunda venida del Señor – lit. 'The Second Coming of the Lord'. It was suspended a few days later under the directive of the Sixth District Court in Administrative Matters in Mexico City.

== Works and exhibitions ==
=== Works ===
Name	Medium	Date	Ref.
La Revolución	Oil paint	2014	
El sueño	Oil paint	2013	
Del que pica	Oil paint	2016	
La venida del Señor	Oil paint	2018	
Caricias a Herrán	Oil paint	2020	
Transverberación	Bronze sculpture	2021	

=== Solo exhibitions ===
Name	Location	Date	Ref.
Lolitos	Galería La Dolorosa (San Cristóbal de las Casas)	2010	
Corazón de quinceañera	University of Sciences and Arts of Chiapas	2012	
Invisible	Galería Hazme el milagrito (CDMX)	2013	
El Jardín de las delicias	Jose Maria Velasco Gallery, Instituto Nacional de Bellas Artes y Literatura	2015	
Deliquios masculinos	Galería CONACULTA (Tuxtla Gutiérrez)	2016	
La floración de las suculentas	Imaginart Gallery (Barcelona)	2021	
Other Colors	Mexican Art Society (London)	2021	
El Vergel	Estación Zócalo/Tenochtitlan	2022	
Las Plumas Ardiendo al Vuelo	Museo La Neomudejar (Madrid)	2023	
La inocencia de las bestias	Museo Universitario del Chopo	7–30 June 2024	
La venida del Señor	Academy of San Carlos	February–March 2025	

=== Multi-artist exhibitions ===
Name	Location	Date	Ref.
Royal Talents	Museo Soumaya	2015	
Emiliano: Zapata después de Zapata	Palacio de Bellas Artes	27 November 2019 – 16 February 2020	
LOVE	Rautenstrauch-Joest Museum	2022	
Imaginaciones radicales	Museo de Arte Moderno	2023	
Amexica	Institut Culturel du Mexique (Paris)	2023	
Visites Inesperades	Fundació Vila Casas	2023	
