= François Pluchart =

French art critic and journalist

François Pluchart (5 August 1937 – 27 November 1988) was a French art critic and journalist. He was one of the theorists of Body art in France, with artists like Michel Journiac and Gina Pane. Pluchart founded the art journal ArTitudes.
