= ArTitudes =

ArTitudes was a French art magazine established in 1971 by art critic François Pluchart. The first issue appeared in October 1971. From 1971 to 1972 the publisher was Société de Presse Bridaine. The headquarters was in Paris.

It had a decisive role in the development and diffusion of body art in France. Artists like Michel Journiac or Gina Pane frequently wrote articles in the magazine. As of 1973 the magazine, ArTitudes International, was published monthly and began to cover English language articles in addition to French ones.

The magazine changed title three times:

- ArTitudes, from 1971 to 1972, 8 issues
- ArTitudes International, from 1972 to 1977, 17 issues
- Info ArTitudes, from 1975 to 1977, 20 issues
