= Kathy O'Dell =

Historian

- Born: Kathy Rosalyn O'Dell; 1950
- Education: B.A., Colby College; M.A., University of California, Berkeley; Ph.D., Graduate Center of the City University of New York
- Known for: Art theory: violent practices in performance art

Kathy Rosalyn O'Dell (born 1950) is an art historian, theorist, curator, arts advocate, author, and special assistant to the Dean for Arts Partnerships at the University of Maryland Baltimore County. She is known for art theories, especially for contextualizing violence in performance art within social contracts and psychoanalytic theories.

== Early life and education ==
O'Dell, born in 1950, is the daughter of L. Dwight O'Dell and Ruth Horner O'Dell, of Chaffee, New York.

O'Dell earned her B.A. in French and Art from Colby College in 1973, and her M.A. in Art History in 1982 from the University of California, Berkeley. He masters thesis was Allan Kaprow: The Artist as Educator. In 1992 she earned a Ph.D. in Art History from the Graduate Center of the City University of New York. Her dissertation was titled, Toward a theory of performance art: an investigation of its sites.

O'Dell is married to John Mernit and they live in Catonsville, Maryland. They have one daughter.

== Career ==
After completing her baccalaureate degree, O'Dell worked initially as a financial advisor's assistant at Bill Lange Securities in San Francisco. For a year she was a gallery assistant at Daniel Weinberg Gallery, also in San Francisco, before becoming program coordinator at 80 Langton Street between 1976 and 1979. O'Dell held adjunct and visiting positions at School of Visual Arts, Adelphi University, Stanford University, and the University of California, Berkeley. She joined the faculty of the Visual Arts department at the University of Maryland, Baltimore County in 1992.

From 2001 to 2014, O'Dell served as Associate Dean of the College of Arts, Humanities, and Social Sciences. She became Special Assistant to the Dean for Education and Arts Partnerships in 2014.

Her research interests have focused on "performance art, global art, issues of violence, and the importance of the esoteric", and her academic interests include "contemporary art history and theory, as well as the writing practices of artists". She is a co-founder and editor of Link: A Critical Journal on the Arts in Baltimore and the World.

== Selected publications ==
=== Books ===
In 1998, O'Dell published Contract with the Skin: Masochism, Performance Art, and the 1970s, in which she posited that the growth of masochistic performance during the 1970s may be understood in context of societal responses to the Vietnam War and corresponding changes in social contract theories. Jane Harris of TDR: The Drama Review, wrote, "Contract with the Skin weaves a thorough and compelling narrative, laudable for its synthesis of contractual and psychoanalytic theories, its redemption of masochistic art practice, and its commitment to a much misunderstood group of artists. Her efforts to map a new terrain deserve nothing short of praise." Tracy Warr wrote that the book makes a "... significant contribution to the contemporary critique of transgressive art in the last three decades."

Art in America's review said that O'Dell places masochistic performances in the Vietnam-era political context, understanding them through psychological, social or legal contracts. She theorizes that masochistic performance artists point out trouble in social institutions —law and the home— which are founded upon contract principles. O'Dell transposes social contract into avant-garde performance.

BOMB Magazine's review said,

In her astute analysis, O'Dell untangles the social, psychological and legal implications of such infamous creative acts as Chris Burden shooting himself, Vito Acconci biting his arm and filling the teeth marks with ink, Gina Pane slitting her lip with a razor blade and Ulay sewing his mouth shut while Marina Abramović attempted to articulate his thoughts. O'Dell argues that we need to move beyond the fact of pain and examine the ways in which these artists' masochistic strategies push the limits of an implicit contract between the performer and audience. O'Dell draws on an impressive range of sources to develop her theory of how masochism operates in these artists' work—and indeed it is her ability to draw connections between the psychological and legal aspects of the contract that enables us to make a conceptual leap beyond the fact of pain.

— Coco Fusco

Mary Kelly, then chair of UCLA's Department of Art, described its focus and photographic documentation of 1970s artists Vito Acconci, Chris Burden, Gina Pane, collaborators Marina Abramović / Ulay, as well as late-1980s artists Bob Flanagan, David Wojnarowicz, Simon Leung, Catherine Opie, Ron Athey, Lutz Bacher, and Robby Garfinkel. Kelly wrote that O'Dell has made the first detailed study of heterogeneous, elusive movements of the 1970s, exposing gender bias of art criticism and introducing new critical apparatus to assess ephemeral art forms. Kelly concluded, "Kathy O'Dell has provided a scholarly, provocative, and important resource for historians of contemporary art."

Henry Sayre of Art Journal commented on O'Dell's uncanny use of photographic documentation she has chosen to illustrate her argument. He continued, "The photograph does, at its best, reflect something that we recognize as a part of ourselves that has, until the moment we see it, remained hidden—or, more properly speaking, sublimated."

In No Innocent Bystanders, Frazer Ward wrote of O'Dell's theories as expressed in Contract with the Skin:

...an idea of masochism derived from the philosopher Gilles Deleuze's encounter with the Marquis de Sade in Coldness and Cruelty, with its emphasis on the "masochistic contract." Writing about Chris Burden's Shoot, for instance, she says: "Each of the individuals involved, therefore, agreed to tacit or specified terms of a "contract" with the artist. . . . [T]he crucial implication of such masochistic performances concerns the everyday agreements—or contracts—that we all make with others but that may not be in our own best interests." The effect of this, for O'Dell, is to reveal the alienation bound up with such everyday agreements. Generally, the "masochistic" artists of the seventies, "wanted to reactivate a meeting of the minds, specifically in the form of a negotiation of differences between individuals or negotiation among the various identities inherent in one's own being."

=== Selected exhibition catalogs, articles, and book chapters ===
O'Dell curated and published the exhibition catalog for Kate Millett, Sculptor: The First 38 Years in conjunction with the show held February 27–April 5, 1997, at the Fine Arts Gallery, University of Maryland. John Dorsey of The Baltimore Sun wrote that the exhibit included Millett's most important series, and gave them a logical installation. O'Dell also produced "a praiseworthy catalog with an essay by Millett as well as O'Dell's own clear and thorough essay on Millett's work", including a video interview with Millett. Dorsey continued, "So there is much to like about this project. But repetition and lack of force make the work itself disappointing." Critic Grace Glueck of The New York Times wrote, "No one gets by in 38 years without producing some clinkers, and there are more than a few in this show." Glueck criticized O'Dell's choices, saying she "should have used a firmer editorial hand."

Other of her publications include:

- O'Dell, Kathy. "Crossing Over the Line: Matt Mullican's Hypnosis Performances and the Power of Metaphor," in Matt Mullican: More Details from an Imaginary Universe, ed. Michael Tarantino. Porto, Portugal: Museu de Arte Contemporânea de Serralves, 2000: pages 24–25.
- O'Dell, Kathy (1 November 1997). "Fluxus Feminus" (PDF). TDR. 41 (1): 43–60. doi:10.2307/1146571. JSTOR 1146571.
- O'Dell, Kathy. (January 1988) "Through the Image Maze," Art in America, volume 76, number 1: pages 114–123.
- O'Dell, Kathy (1 January 1997). "Displacing the Haptic: Performance Art, the Photographic Document, and the 1970s". Performance Research. 2 (1): 73–81. doi:10.1080/13528165.1997.10871536.

== See also ==
- Fluxus
