= Arte Fiera =

Art fair in Bologna, Italy

Arte Fiera is an international modern and contemporary art fair sited annually in Bologna, Italy, and was established in 1974. It is the oldest and biggest art fair in Italy. A separate section of Arte Fiera is held annually in Shanghai, China.

== History ==
Arte Fiera was founded in 1974 at the BolognaFiere pavilions designed by Kenzō Tange and soon became a landmark for international art scene. It has helped to expand the contemporary artistic research, including through parallel events such as the "Settimane internazionali della performance", which in 1977 and 1978 have hosted some of the greatest performers at the moment, like Marina Abramović and Ulay, Hermann Nitsch, Vito Acconci, Gina Pane, Luigi Ontani, etc. Over time this fair had a great participation of Italian and international galleries, collectors and the public.

In recent editions grew the relationship with the city of Bologna, through a large agenda of events in downtown, called Art City. In 2013 was born the SetUp Art Fair, an "independent contemporary art fair" dedicated to emerging artists and independent galleries, that takes place at the Bologna Autostazione.

In the 2014 edition, which took place from 24 to 27 January, it included 172 galleries, 1500 works by more than 1100 artists, and drew about 50,000 visitors.

The 39th edition, in 2015, takes place from 23 to 26 January and includes a total of 216 exhibitors, among which 188 galleries.

=== Sections ===
The main sections of Arte Fiera are:

- Arte moderna e contemporanea / Modern and contemporary art
- Nuove proposte / New proposals
- Fotografia / Photography
- Focus on Eastern European countries
- Solo Show

== Arte Fiera in Shanghai ==
Arte Fiera debuted in Shanghai in 2007. This event is called BolognaFiere SH Contemporary and takes place at the Shanghai Exhibition Centre in September. These are the main sections:

- Galleries
- Country Guest
- Promising
- Special Projects
- Talks
