= Sergio Zanni =

Italian painter and sculptor (born 1942)

Sergio Zanni (born 22 May 1942) is an Italian painter and sculptor.

== Life and career ==
Zanni was born on 22 May 1942 in Ferrara. After obtaining the Diploma at the Institute of Arts 'Dosso Dossi' in Ferrara, Italy, he graduated from the Academy of Arts (Accademia delle Belle Arti) in Bologna. He taught in the Institute of Arts 'Dosso Dossi' until 1995.

For his research in sculpturing he utilized backed clay and, successively, lighter material for sculptures of large dimensions.

Vittorio Sgarbi has defined Zanni a "surrealism from the Po Plain".

Sergio Zanni defines his research in arts and sculpture: "My job allows me to continuously travel in order to discover unknown sites. These sites have been materialized in several characters: hermits, rain men, killers, war memorials, devils, attendants of the plains, gypsies, observers, hikers. Deep-sea divers, water, front-less characters, pilots, cloud hunters, oblomov, smokers, painters of war, mysterious angels, with no front, siren’s songs, and go on until to the last sculptures, the equilibrists, Ulysses and other hikers. Near the end of the 20s century I wonder about realizing large sized sculptures: the loved backed clay is regrettably heavy and fragile. I was forced in some way to test more handy and less noble materials than the backed clay. In this last step the experience with the polystyrene covered by kryptonite and iron balls (all very recent materials used on the stages), fibreglass, iron rods and assemblages with iron material took place. From these materials my largest sculptures aroused: kamikazes, the wagon of the winners, the six white pilots, the large traveller."

== Solo and group art exhibitions ==
- 1973 – Centro attività visive, palazzo dei Diamanti, Ferrara
- 1976 – Galleria Intermidia, Ferrara
- 1978 – Chiesa di Santa Lucia, Bologna
- 1979 – Accademia dei Concordi, Rovigo
- 1980 – Artaga, galleria comunale, Faenza
- 1981 – Aletheia – Lethe immaginale pagano, mostra itinerante, Palazzo dei Diamanti, Ferrara; Palazzo Alberini, Forlì; Loggetta Lombardesca, Ravenna
- 1983 – Galleria Zarathustra, Milan
- 1984 – Galleria Tommaseo, Trieste; Galleria l'Officina, Trieste; Galleria Cristina Busi, Chiavari; Galleria Minima, Reggio Emilia; La persistenza del mito nella pittura e scultura degli anni '80, Centro comunale di cultura, Valenza; Tridimensionale, Termoli; IV Rassegna internazionale della ceramica, Caltagirone
- 1985 – Biennale di Milano
- 1986 – Galleria Rossana Ferri, Modena; Teatro et Mitologie, Philippe Giumiot Art Gallery, Brussels
- 1987 – Santa Maria delle Croci, Ravenna
- 1988 – Galleria Il Bulino, Modena
- 1989 – Galleria Il Girasole, Legnago
- 1991 – Galleria Tommaseo, Trieste
- 1992 – Sala Benvenuto da Garofalo, Palazzo dei Diamanti, Ferrara
- 1993 – Galleria San Carlo, Milan; Galleria Rosso Tiziano, Piacenza; Galleria Modula Arte, Parma
- 1995 – Circolo degli artisti, Faenza; La pittura e la scultura fantastica e visionaria, Centro culturale di esposizione e comunicazione "Le Zitelle", Venice; Biennale del Bronzetto, Padua; Galleria Stadmaeuer, Villach, (Austria)
- 1996 – Galleria San Carlo, Milan; Galleria Palazzo Vecchio, 2, Florence; Omaggio a Sergio Zanni: Terra plasmata, Fiera artigiana, Florence; XXII Premio Sulmuna, Sulmuna; Monumentalmente vostro, Villa Pacchiani, Santa Croce sull'Arno, Pisa; Migrazioni spirituali mediterranee, Bettona (Perugia); 25 anni di scultura in Europa: le opere della Fonderia Venturi arte, Delizia Estense del Verginese, Portomaggiore (Ferrara); Le forme del fuoco: 100 sculture in Montenapoleone, Milan; Galleria Rosso Tiziano, Piacenza
- 1997 – Galleria Modula Arte, Parma; XXXVIII Mostra della ceramica, Castellamonte; Omaggio a Morandi, Grizzana Morandi; Ancora è calda l'erba sui miei prati, Galleria Forni, Milan
- 1998 – Continuità dell'immagine, Galleria Davico, Turin
- 1999 – Galleria Davico, Turin; Galleria Forni, Bologna
- 2000 – Arte Fiera, Bologna
- 2002 – Galleria Cristina Busi, Chiavari
- 2005 – Etroubles, Museo a cielo aperto
- 2006 – Galleria Forni, Bologna, Di Ulisse e d'altri viandanti
- 2007 – Equilibri di viaggio, Balocco Art Hotel, Porto Cervo, Arzachena; Difformi forme, Galleria Marchesi, Ferrara; Biennale del Muro Dipinto 2007, Rocca Sforzesca – Pinacoteca, Dozza (Bologna); Copulamundi, C.ETRA, Castel Bolognese (Ravenna)
- 2008 – Sergio Zanni – Viaggiatori, viandanti ed equilibristi, Cà Cornera, Porto Viro (Rovigo); Sebastiano tra sacro e profano, Monica Benini Arte, Ferrara; Anch'io Pinocchio, Galleria del Carbone, Ferrara
- 2009 – Il cielo alla rovescia, Galleria del Carbone, Ferrara; Arte per Emergency, Galleria del Carbone, Ferrara; Sergio Zanni – L'Auriga, il Nichilista e il Viandante, Galleria del Carbone, Ferrara; Generazioni, Istituto d'Arte "Dosso Dossi", Palazzo Cavalieri, Ferrara; Tredicesima ora. 12 + 1 Interpretazioni sul tempo, Laboratorio di Ingegneria e Architettura Marchingegno
- 2010 – Il cielo alla rovescia. Il cielo in una scatola. Omaggio a Galileo, Casa di Virginio Ariosto, Bondeno (FE); Puerto Sebastian: Il mito di San Sebastiano nell'arte contemporanea, Museo Parmeggiani, Cento (Ferrara); Sergio Zanni – Sculture e disegni, Galleria Cristina Busi, Chiavari (GE); Gallerie al Museo, MIC Museo Internazionale delle Ceramiche, Faenza (Ravenna)
- 2011 – 54° Biennale di Venezia, Padiglione Italia, Venice; Progetto Scultura 2011, Castel Sismondo, Rimini; In Illo Tempore/Daniela Carletti, Castello della Rocca, Cento (Ferrara)
- 2012 – Illustrissimo Pinocchio – Immagini ferraresi, Portomaggiore (Ferrara); ...e come esuli pensieri..., Galleria del Carbone (Ferrara); Metamorfosi, Maurizio Bonora, Gianni Guidi, Sergio Zanni, Galleria del Carbone (Ferrara); Das Szenische in der Bildenden Kunst (Rolf Escher, Sergio Zanni, Viktor Müllerstaedt), Georgia Berlin Galerie (Berlin); Omaggio a Michelangelo Antonioni dagli amici della Galleria del Carbone, Galleria del Carbone (Ferrara)
- 2013 – Biennale Internazionale di Scultura, Castello di Racconigi; I cercatori dell'immutabile, Spazio Rosso Tiziano (Piacenza)
- 2014 – Künstler aus Ferrara, Italien, KREIS Galerie (Nurenberg)
- 2021–2022 – Sergio Zanni. Volumi narranti, Padiglione di Arte Contemporanea, Ferrara
