= Rest Energy =

Rest Energy may refer to:

- Rest energy, concept in particle physics
- Rest Energy (performance piece)
