= Breathing in/breathing out =

Live performance art

Breathing In, Breathing Out is a performance piece by Marina Abramović and Ulay. It was performed twice, in Belgrade (1977) and Amsterdam (1978). For this performance the two artists blocked their nostrils with cigarette filters and pressed their mouths together, so that one could not inhale anything else but the exhalation of the other. As the carbon dioxide filled their lungs, they began to sweat, move vehemently and wear themselves out; the viewers could sense their agony through the projected sound of breathing, which was augmented via microphones attached to their chests. It took them 19 minutes in the first performance and 15 in the second to consume all the oxygen in that one breath and reach the verge of passing out.

During the 19 minutes of the Performance at the Studenski Kulturni Centar in Belgrade, one hears the noise of their breathing in and out. Ulay commented on the Performance: "I breathe in oxygen and breathe out carbon dioxide." Abramović: "I breathe in carbon dioxide and breathe out carbon dioxide," and Ulay repeated Marina’s sentence. The second part of the Performance took place in November of the same year at the Stedelijk Museum in Amsterdam. Here, breath as the giver of life becomes a symbol of keeping one another alive, of interdependence and of the interchange between male and female principle.

== See also ==
- Rhythm 0
- Seven Easy Pieces
- Avant-garde
- Experimental theatre
