= Marco Anelli =

Italian photographer

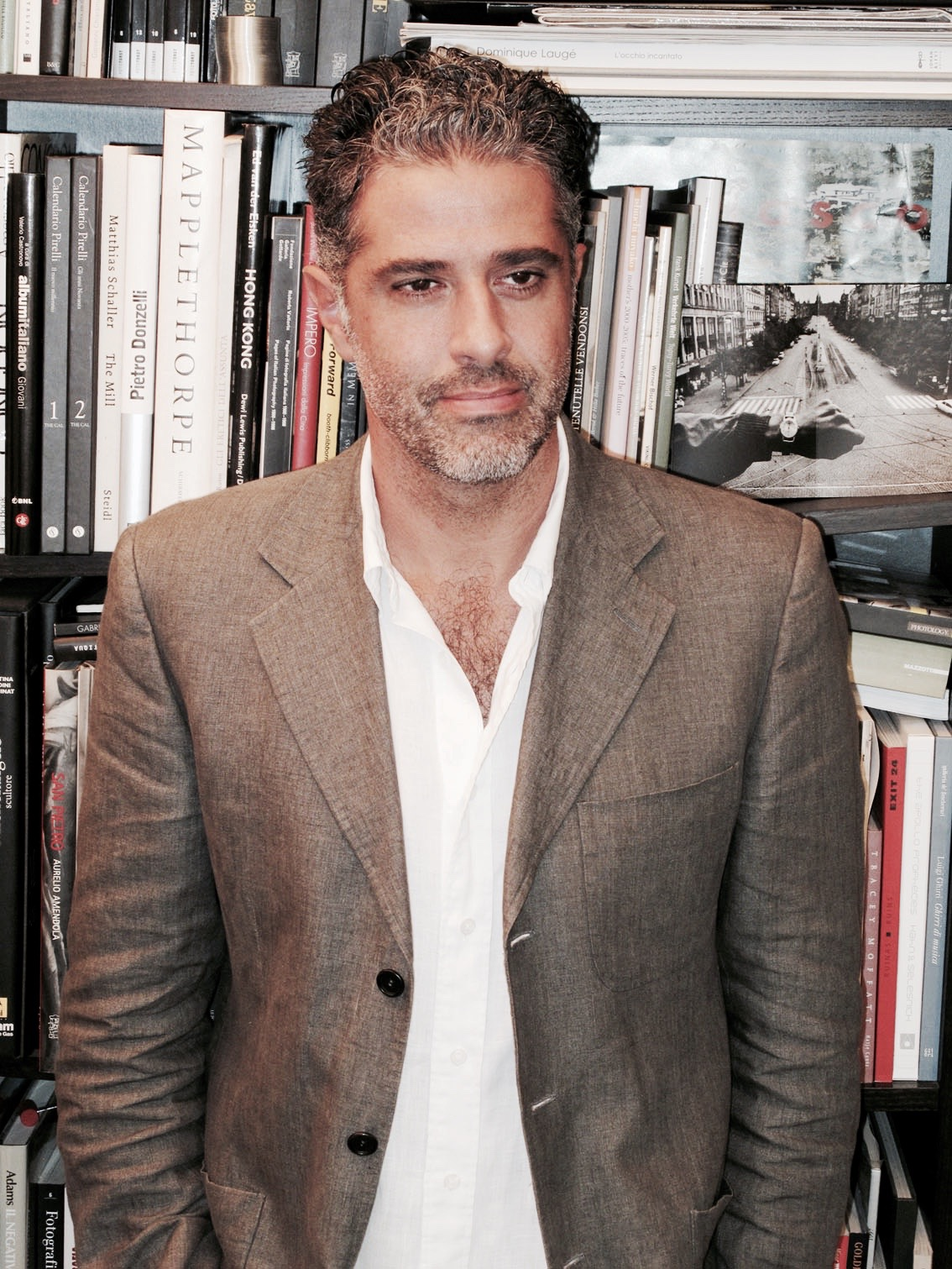
- Marco Anelli in conversation with Marina Abramovic. New York, October 16, 2012. Book Signing @ STRAND
- Born: 1968 (age 57–58); Rome, Italy
- Known for: Photographer
- Notable work: ' Portraits in the presence of Marina Abramović', ‘The Gestures of the Spirit’
- Movement: Fine-art photography
- Awards: Fuji Prize (2000), ‘Mario Giacomelli Memorial Prize (2001).
- Website: marcoanelli.com

Marco Anelli (born October 31, 1968, in Roma) is an Italian photographer.

He began his career in Paris where he specialized in black&white printing techniques. His photographic research projects evolve over long periods of time and explore different subjects. His publications include works on architecture, landscape, portraiture, sport and classical music. In 2010 he carried out Portraits in the Presence of Marina Abramovic, (Damiani, 2010) portraying the 1,545 participants in The Artist Is Present by Marina Abramovic at the MoMA, New York. In Building Magazzino (Rizzoli, 2017) he documented the transformation of an old computer factory into Magazzino Italian Art, a new art space in Cold Spring, NY cofounded by Nancy Olnick and Giorgio Spanu. Artist Studios New York (Damiani, 2020) explores the character and creative space of worldwide famous artists such as Alex Katz, Cecily Brown, Francesco Clemente, Joan Jonas, John Giorno, Julian Schnabel, Kiki Smith, Lawrence Weiner, Matthew Barney, Robert Longo, Shirin Neshat, Ugo Rondinone, Urs Fisher. TINO, Nivola in America is his last published book (Silvana Editoriale and Magazzino Italian Art, 2021) in which Anelli’s photographic research focuses on Costantino Nivola’s sculptures scattered throughout the US.

He lives and works in New York City.

== Books and significant catalogues ==
- Shadow and Light in St. Peter's (Silvana Editoriale 1999)
- Il Calcio (Motta Publisher 2002)
- Pallacorda (Skira 2004)
- La Musica Immaginata (Motta Publisher 2004)
- All' Ombra del Duomo (Contrasto 2010)
- Gestures of the Spirit (Peliti Publisher 2011)
- Portraits in the Presence of Marina Abramović (Damiani Publisher 2012)
- Building Magazzino (Rizzoli, 2017)
- Artist Studios New York (Damiani 2020)
- Portraits in the Presence of Marina Abramović (Damiani 2021)
- Tino, Nivola in America (Silvana Editoriale 2021)

== Awards ==
Anelli has won the Fuji Prize (Italy, 2000), the Mario Giacomelli Memorial Award and the Canon Prize in 2001
