= Trans-Fixed =

1974 performance

- Artist: Chris Burden
- Year: 1974
- Medium: Performance, documentary photographs

Trans-Fixed was a 1974 performance by Chris Burden in which he was crucified onto a Volkswagen Beetle.

== Description ==
On April 23, 1974, performance artist Chris Burden was crucified shirtless onto the back of a pale blue Volkswagen Beetle. Burden stood on the car's rear bumper and leaned backwards. His attorney hammered two nails through his open palms into the roof. Three other assistants ran the engine and opened the garage door, which opened into an alley called Speedway in Venice, California. The assistants rolled the car out of the garage, where it ran while stationary for two minutes with the engine at full throttle. Fifteen of his friends were there, having been invited but not briefed on what to expect.

Burden later displayed relics from the performance, including a plaque alongside the two nails.

== Analysis and legacy ==
The performance was religiously charged in its reference to the crucifixion of Jesus. Burden himself was not Catholic. Interpretations of the piece include Burden atoning for outcry against his prior body art works, or giving commentary on the forgotten connection between the "people's car" built by Nazi Germany. Art historians did not know whether to classify it as shamanistic or male egotism.

The performance artist Marina Abramović sought to use the work in her Seven Easy Pieces but Burden denied her permission.

Dale Eisinger of Complex described Trans-Fixed as Burden's most captivating work in his 2013 list of the greatest performance art works. David Bowie's "Joe the Lion" alludes to Burden's performance.

== Bibliography ==
- Cotkin, George (2016). "Crucified and Shot: Chris Burden, 1974". Feast of Excess: A Cultural History of the New Sensibility. Oxford University Press. pp. 323–. ISBN 978-0-19-021847-8.
- Haden-Guest, Anthony (1998). True Colors: The Real Life of the Art World. Atlantic Monthly Press. ISBN 978-0-87113-725-8.
