= Michel Journiac =

- Born: 1935
- Died: 1995 (aged 59–60)

Michel Journiac (1935–1995) was one of the founders of the 1960s and 1970s body art movement in France, called "Art corporel". During these years, many artists started to use the human body as their material. Accordingly, this artist used his own body to perform rituals which he documented through photography or video. His work can be compared to those of Vito Acconci, French artist Gina Pane or Austrian artists of the Viennese Actionism.

It was through his photographic works, his actions and installations, that he made his fame and became known.

His most famous action is probably Messe pour un corps (Mass for a Body) (1969) a parody of catholic liturgy where he officiated as a priest, offering the audience pieces of blood sausage made with his own blood.

Michel Journiac also wrote two poetry books, Le Sang nu (Naked Blood) (1968) and Délit du corps (Crime of the Body) (1978) and many articles, especially in French art journal ArTitudes.

== Selected works ==
- Piège pour un voyeur (Trap for a Voyeur), installation, 1969
- Messe pour un corps (Mass for a Body), performance, 1969
- Hommage à freud (Tribute to Freude), photographic series, 1972
- Piège pour un travesti (Trap for a Transvestite), photographic series, 1972
- Contrat de prostitution (Prostitution Contract), installation, 1973
- 24 heures de la vie d’une femme ordinaire ( 24 Hours in the Life of an Ordinary Woman), photographic series, 1974
- L’inceste (The Incest), photographic series, 1975
- Rituel de transmutation (Transmutation Ritual), performance, photography1993

== Articles about Michel Journiac ==
Sarah Wilson, " Michel Journiac's Masquerades, Incest, Drag and the Anti-Oedipus ", 2003 in Benthien, Claudia, Stephan, Inge (dir.) Mannlichkeit als Maskerade. Gender Studien mit blick auf 'den' Mann, Köln, Böhlau Verlag, 2003, pp. 128–153. (Article consultable sur le site : https://web.archive.org/web/20100921175911/http://courtauld.ac.uk/people/wilson-sarah/JOURNIAC.pdf)
