= Neša Paripović =

Serbian artist

- Born: 1942 (age 83–84); Belgrade, German-occupied Serbia
- Known for: Performance art, film, photography
- Movement: Conceptual art
- Spouse: Marina Abramović (m. 1971; div. 1976)

Neša Paripović (Serbian Cyrillic: Неша Париповић) is a Serbian artist. He is considered a key protagonist of conceptual art in Serbia (then part of the former Yugoslavia) in the 1970s. He was married to Marina Abramović from 1971 to 1976.

== Biography ==
Paripović was born in Belgrade in 1942, in Nazi-occupied Yugoslavia (now Serbia). In 1969, he graduated from the Belgrade Academy of Fine Arts. From 1971 to 1973, he trained under the tutelage of Croatian naive artist Krsto Hegedušić. During this time, he would be a founding member of the newly opened Belgrade Student Cultural Center, collaborating alongside a group of artists informally dubbed the Group of Six Artists or the Belgrade Six. Marina Abramović, who was among them, married Paripović in 1971 and divorced him five years later.

Between 1975 and 1980, he collaborated with the Belgrade "conceptually oriented art collective" Group 143. Since 1991, he's been a member of Belgrade theater ensemble Dah Teatar (in Serbian). He currently lives and works in Belgrade.

== Art ==
As one of the most influential Serbian conceptual artists, Paripović's work has spanned a variety of mediums, including photography, films, paintings, and posters. His most famous piece, N.P. 1977, is a 22 minute silent film where he walks in a disjointed line across Belgrade, "disappear[ing] around a corner only to reappear through a hole in a wall in a different part of town... [H]e moves in what is actually not a line at all, but a labyrinth, where there is no beginning and no end."

The quasi-surrealist nature of his art has been attributed in part to the tumultuous political atmosphere of post-war Yugoslavia, and is considered to be a part of a radical new wave art movement that "criticised art’s status quo" and "rejected the idea of art as a commodity." Today, much of his art has been lost to time, attributed to the fact that "the artist started off in a post-object phase."

== See also ==
- List of painters from Serbia
