= Body Pressure =

Performance by Bruce Nauman

Body Pressure is a 1974 performance piece by American artist Bruce Nauman. The performer or viewer is instructed to press "as much of the front surface of your body ... against the wall as possible", then to "[p]ress very hard and concentrate ... Think how various parts of your body press against the wall; which parts touch and which do not". Nauman says that it "may become a very erotic exercise".

The piece was re-interpreted and performed by Marina Abramović as part of her Seven Easy Pieces in 2005.
