= How to Explain Pictures to a Dead Hare =

1965 performance by Joseph Beuys

How to Explain Pictures to a Dead Hare (German: Wie man dem toten Hasen die Bilder erklärt) is a performance piece staged by the German artist Joseph Beuys on 26 November 1965 at the Galerie Schmela in Düsseldorf. While it was only Beuys’s first solo exhibition in a private gallery, it is sometimes referred to as his best known action.

== Process ==
At the beginning of the performance Beuys locked the gallery doors from the inside, leaving the gallery-goers outside. They could observe the scene within only through the windows. With his head entirely coated in honey and gold leaf, he began to explain pictures to a dead hare. Whispering to the dead animal on his arm in an apparent dialog, he processed through the exhibit from artwork to artwork. Occasionally he would stop and return to the center of the gallery, where he stepped over a dead fir tree that lay on the floor. After three hours the public was let into the room. Beuys sat upon a stool in the entrance area with the hare on his arm and his back to the onlookers.

== Interpretation and context ==
The performance was the high point of Beuys' development of a broadened definition of art, which had already begun in his drawings of the 1950s. He celebrated the ritual of "explaining art" with an action that was, for his viewers, effectively silent.

The relationship between thought, speech, and form in this performance was also characteristic of Beuys. In his last speech Speaking about Germany (German: Sprechen über Deutschland, 1985) he emphasized that he was essentially a man of words. In another instance he is quoted as saying: "When I speak, I try to guide that power's impulse so that it flows into a more fully descriptive language, which is the spiritual perception of growth." (Note: German: „Wenn ich spreche (…), versuche ich die Impulse dieser Kraft einzuführen, die aus einem volleren Sprachbegriff fließen, welcher der geistige Begriff der Entwicklung ist.“) The integration of speech and conversation into his visual works plays a meaningful role in How to Explain Pictures to a Dead Hare.

The hare is an animal with broad, centuries-old symbolic meaning in many religions. In Greek mythology it was associated with the love goddess Aphrodite, to the Romans and Germanic tribes it was a symbol of fertility, and in Christianity it came to be connected with the Resurrection. This interpretation is also supported by the "mask" that Beuys wore during his performance: gold as a symbol for the power of the sun, wisdom, and purity, and honey as a Germanic symbol for rebirth.

Beuys explained:

For me the Hare is a symbol of incarnation, which the hare really enacts- something a human can only do in imagination. It burrows, building itself a home in the earth. Thus it incarnates itself in the earth: that alone is important. So it seems to me. Honey on my head of course has to do with thought. While humans do not have the ability to produce honey, they do have the ability to think, to produce ideas. Therefore the stale and morbid nature of thought is once again made living. Honey is an undoubtedly living substance- human thoughts can also become alive. On the other hand intellectualizing can be deadly to thought: one can talk one's mind to death in politics or in academia. (Note: German: „Für mich ist der Hase das Symbol für die Inkarnation, Denn der Hase macht das ganz real, was der Mensch nur in Gedanken kann. Er gräbt sich ein, er gräbt sich einen Bau. Er inkarniert sich in die Erde, und das allein ist wichtig. So kommt er bei mir vor. Mit Honig auf dem Kopf tue ich natürlich etwas, was mit denken zu tun hat. Die menschliche Fähigkeit ist, nicht Honig abzugeben, sondern zu denken, Ideen abzugeben. Dadurch wird der Todescharakter des Gedankens wieder lebendig gemacht. Denn Honig ist zweifelslos eine lebendige Substanz. Der menschliche Gedanke kann auch lebendig sein. Er kann aber auch interellektualisierend tödlich sein, auch tot bleiben, sich todbringend äußern etwa im politischen Bereich oder der Pädagogik.“)

Such materials and actions had specific symbolic value for Beuys. For example, honey was the product of bees who, for Beuys (following Rudolf Steiner), represented an ideal society of warmth and brotherhood. Gold had its importance within alchemy, and iron, the metal of Mars, stood for the masculine principles of strength and connection to the earth. A photograph from the performance, in which Beuys is sitting with the hare, has been described "by some critics as a new Mona Lisa of the 20th century," though Beuys did not agree with that.

The performance is considered a key work, and was re-created by Marina Abramović in 2005 at the Solomon R. Guggenheim Museum in New York as part of her series Seven Easy Pieces.

== Note on translations ==
The English translations of quotes from Beuys used in this article are not in any way official. Any misrepresentation of the artist's meaning is unintentional. For the purpose of transparency the original German is presented below.
