= Seedbed (performance piece) =

1972 performance artwork by Vito Acconci

Seedbed is a performance piece first performed by Vito Acconci on 15–29 January 1972 at Sonnabend Gallery in New York City.

In the piece, there is a low wooden ramp merging with the floor. The ramp extends across the width of the room, beginning two feet up the side of one wall and slanting down to the middle of the floor.

In his original performance of the piece, Acconci lay hidden underneath the ramp installed at the Sonnabend Gallery, masturbating. The artist's spoken fantasies about the visitors walking above him were heard through loudspeakers in the gallery.

In this legendary sculpture/performance Acconci lay beneath a ramp built in the Sonnabend Gallery. Over the course of three weeks, he masturbated eight hours a day while whispering out his sexual fantasies. Not only does the architectural intervention presage much of his subsequent work, but all of Acconci's fixations converge in this, the spiritual sphincter of his art. In Seedbed, Acconci is the producer and the receiver of the work's pleasure. He is simultaneously public and private, making marks yet leaving little behind, and demonstrating ultra-awareness of his viewer while being in a semi-trance state.

— Jerry Saltz

A video of the piece shows Acconci masturbating.

Marina Abramović performed Seedbed as part of her Seven Easy Pieces in 2005. In 2013, Dale Eisinger of Complex ranked Seedbed the 22nd best work of performance art in history.
