= Body art =

Art with the human body

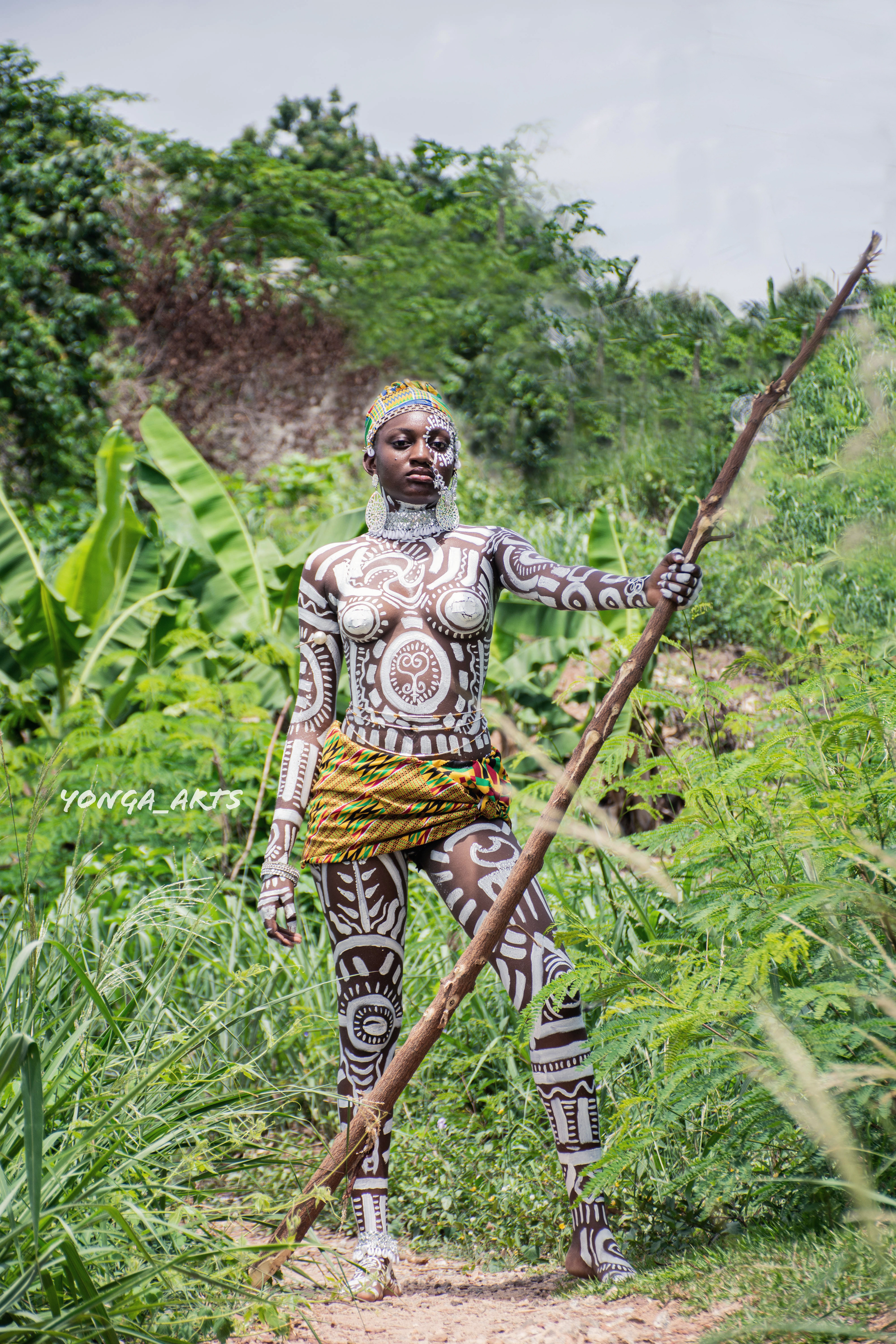
Body painting

Body art is art in which the artist uses the human body as the primary medium. Emerging from the context of Conceptual Art during the 1970s, Body art may include performance art. Body art is likewise utilized for investigations of the body in an assortment of different media including painting, casting, photography, film and video. More extreme body art can involve mutilation or pushing the body to its physical limits.

In more recent times, the body has become a subject of much broader discussion and treatment than can be reduced to body art in its common understanding. Important strategies that question the human body are: implants, the body in symbiosis with new technologies, and virtual avatar bodies, among others.

== Popular use of the term ==
Body art has been expanded into popular culture and now covers a wide spectrum of usage, including tattoos, body piercings, scarification, and body painting. Photographer Spencer Tunick is well known for conducting photo shoots which gather large numbers of naked people at public locations around the world.

== Background ==
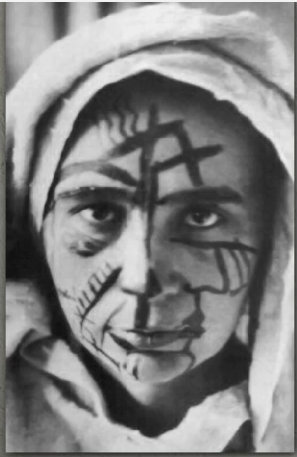
Russian avantgarde painter Natalia Goncharova during her 1913 performance.

Body art often deals with issues of gender and personal identity and common topics include the relationship between body and psyche.

The forerunners were the avant-garde artists. In 1913 Russian Futurists (Ilia Zdanevich, David Burliuk, Milkhail Larionov, Natalia Goncharova) performed an action in Moscow streets with painted faces and later printed the manifesto "Why do we paint ourselves?" in Russian magazine "Argus".

The Vienna Action Group was formed in 1965 by Hermann Nitsch, Otto Mühl, Günter Brus, and Rudolf Schwarzkogler. They performed several body art actions. In the United States Carolee Schneemann, Chris Burden and Vito Acconci were very active participants. Acconci once documented, through photos and text, his daily exercise routine of stepping on and off a chair for as long as possible over several months. Acconci also performed Following Piece, in which he followed randomly chosen New Yorkers.

In France, body art was termed art corporel and practiced by such artists as Michel Journiac, Orlan and Gina Pane while in Italy in the 1980s, one of the famous artists in the movement was Ketty La Rocca.

Artists whose works have evolved with more directed personal mythologies include Rebecca Horn, Youri Messen-Jaschin, Javier Perez, and Jana Sterbak. Body art can also be expressed via writing rather than painting.

== Extreme body art ==
Artists may explore more obscure avenues of portraying the body, such as allowing the audience to use the nude body as a canvas of experimentation and manipulation. The artist may use effects and/or mediums that can dramatize the appearance of the body from the subjective eye of the viewer, or protrude the body with external factors that evoke an emotional sense of disgust to illustrate abuse and objectification. Artists may experiment with how to test the limits of their own bodies, leveling with this discomfort. One of Dennis Oppenheim's better-known works saw him lying in the sunlight with a book on his chest, until his skin, excluding that covered by the book, was badly sunburned. It can even consist of the arrangement and dissection of preserved bodies in an artistic fashion, as was for the plastinated bodies used in the traveling Body Worlds exhibition.

Marina Abramović performed Rhythm 0 in 1974. In the piece, the audience was given instructions to use on Abramović's body an array of 72 provided instruments of pain and pleasure, including knives, feathers, and a loaded pistol. Audience members cut her, pressed thorns into her belly, applied lipstick to her, removed her clothes, and held a loaded pistol to her head. Accounts vary as to how the performance concluded, some stating it ended after a scuffle broke out in the audience over their conduct, while Abramović retells that the artwork simply came to an end after the intended six hours, at which time she stood and walked towards the audience, which fled. Another one of Abramović's works involved dancing until she collapsed from exhaustion.

Christopher Burden is an American artist who has performed several extreme pieces. In his 1971 piece titled Shoot, Burden had a friend shoot him with a rifle in the arm in front of cameras and a small audience. In another piece, Through the Night Softly, he shuffled around on his stomach through broken glass, with his hands bound and in his underwear, as the audience watched him go across the shards. In his piece Trans-Fixed, he crucified himself to a Volkswagen.

French artist Orlan had a series of works in which she modified her body through plastic surgery, modeling herself after the beauty standards in the western world.

== Absence of body ==
This form of body art more so focuses on the silhouettes and shadows of the performing body than the physical form alone. Scientific research in this area, for example that by Stelarc, can be considered in this artistic vein. A special case of the body art strategies is the absence of body. Some artists who performed the "absence" of the body through their artworks were: Davor Džalto, Antony Gormley, and Andy Warhol.

== Performance body art ==
Body art in the form of performances can display the teaching and symbolism of the human body and sexuality. Whether in the act of presenting the anatomy of the human body as flawless, beautiful and bedazzled, or purposefully mutilating it and/or morphing it into a repulsive, questionable position. The point of the performance is to engage the viewer in a reaction to how their mindset interacts with the visualization of the human body. Another form of performance body art comes in the form of symbolism of sexualization and the violation of the body. An example is Yoko Ono's work Cut Piece 1964.

Performance artists Karen Finley and Laurie Anderson evoke obscurity, controversy, and challenge the norms surrounding a woman's power in Western culture. Finley used psychological sensory within her performances, evoking audience disgust in many pieces. Her 1982 piece I'm An Ass Man uses kidney beans and stains the hands of the "rapist" with menstrual blood. In Mr. Hirsch (1990), Finley takes ice cream representative of childhood innocence and angrily stains a girl's dress reflective of trauma. Laurie Andersson uses technology to defy traditional norms of women being silenced and objectified from a distance based on their features. Home of the Brave (1986) externalizes Anderson's body as she protrudes it with an electronic drum. The obnoxious, recognizable noise created by her movement mocks the overexemplified male gaze on the female's body, and encourages further exploration of using the voice as a means of power in female representation.

Ana Mendieta was an artist who throughout her career commented on identity and how parts of identity like race, gender, age and class all work together to express one's true identity. In Untitled (Glass on Body Imprints—face) (1972) Mendieta pressed herself against a pane of glass demonstrating both bodily and facial distress, embodying the suffering felt within the female body.. Untitled (Facial Cosmetic Variations) (1972) is a series of photographs in which Mendieta changes her appearance through makeup and wigs, sometimes lightening her face, questioning her racialization in America. In her Siluenta series she would lay on the ground and mark her silhouette, remarking on the absence of her body from her homeland.

== Body art events ==
The World Naked Bike Ride is an international, semi-annual, clothing-optional bike ride. The largest iteration of the event takes place in Portland, Oregon averaging approximately 10,000 participants and thousands of spectators. During the event riders paint their bodies with messages and artworks to display as they ride through the streets.

Burning Man festival is held annually in the Black Rock Desert of northwest Nevada (US), in September. Jake Lloyd Jones, a Sydney-based artist, conceived the Sydney Body Art Ride, which has become an annual event. Participants are painted to form a living rainbow that rides to the Pacific Ocean and immerses itself in the waves.

== Medical uses for body art ==
Body art, specifically painting on the body is a newly incorporated skill in the medical industry primarily used for schooling. While the primary method for learning bodily physiology is through examining cadavers according to Gabrielle Flinn, some students are very off put by this practice. Organizations are now considering using body painting as a functional, low-cost, and positive way of learning about the inner-workings of anatomical structures through painting. This would consist of medical students painting on, or working with, willing volunteers who have been painted on to expose various body parts such as: lungs, muscles in hands, legs, etc. Hands are the most typically chosen as the patient does not have to undress for the painting examination, however, with consent of the volunteer patient, medical students could paint other areas such as the back. This would allow the medical students to not only learn more about anatomy in a positive manner but also have real life practice in bedside manners, and making sure their patients are comfortable, and well taken care of through the entire process.

== See also ==
- Body modification
- Cyborg art
- Female cosmetic coalitions
- Hair colouring
- Mehndi
- Modern primitive
- Nail art
- Performance art
- Tattoo
- Temporary tattoos
- Vajazzle
