= Rest Energy (performance piece) =

Dutch performance art piece

Rest Energy is a 1980 performance art piece created, enacted, and recorded by performance artist duo Marina Abramović and Ulay in Amsterdam, Netherlands. Four minutes in duration, Abramović has described it as one of the most difficult pieces she has ever done, saying

I was not in charge. In Rest Energy we actually held an arrow on the weight of our bodies, and the arrow is pointed right into my heart. We had two small microphones near our hearts, so we could hear our heartbeats. As our performance was progressing, heartbeats were becoming more and more intense, and though it lasted just four minutes and ten seconds, I’m telling you, for me it was forever. It was a performance about the complete and total trust.

The work is in the collection of the Netherlands Media Art Institute in Amsterdam.
