= Seven Easy Pieces =

Performances by artist Marina Abramović

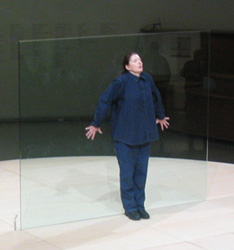
- Artist: Marina Abramović
- Year: 2005
- Type: Performance art
- Location: Guggenheim Museum, New York City

Seven Easy Pieces was a series of performances given by artist Marina Abramović in New York City at the Guggenheim Museum in November 2005. All performances were dedicated to Abramović's late friend Susan Sontag.

Although the performance art world traditionally frowns on repeating individual works, valuing their transient, ephemeral nature as intrinsic to their essence, as she aged, Abramović found herself compelled to preserve the performances that influenced her own development as an artist. Angry at seeing so many of the ideas developed in her and others' performances being appropriated without credit, including by commercial enterprises such as advertising and fashion, Abramović committed herself to archiving seven iconic works by recreating or reinterpreting them in Seven Easy Pieces, but only with the expressed consent of each of the original artists or their estates. "There's nobody to keep the history straight," she told The New York Times in an interview published in early November 2005. "I felt almost, like, obliged. I felt like I have this function to do it."

Seven Easy Pieces is available on DVD.

Seven Easy Pieces comprised seven individual works – two of her own and five by other artists – performed on seven consecutive nights beginning on November 9. The combination of the individual works may be considered a primer on post-structuralism. They were, in order of performance:

- Bruce Nauman's Body Pressure (1974)
- Vito Acconci's Seedbed (1972)
- Valie Export's Action Pants: Genital Panic (1969)
- Gina Pane's The Conditioning (1973)
- Joseph Beuys's How to Explain Pictures to a Dead Hare (1965)
  - Abramović originally intended to recreate Chris Burden's Trans-Fixed (1974)
- Abramović's own Lips of Thomas (1975)
  - Abramović originally intended to recreate her own Rhythm 0 (1974)
- Abramović's own Entering the Other Side (2005)
