= Endurance art =

Kind of performance art involving hardship

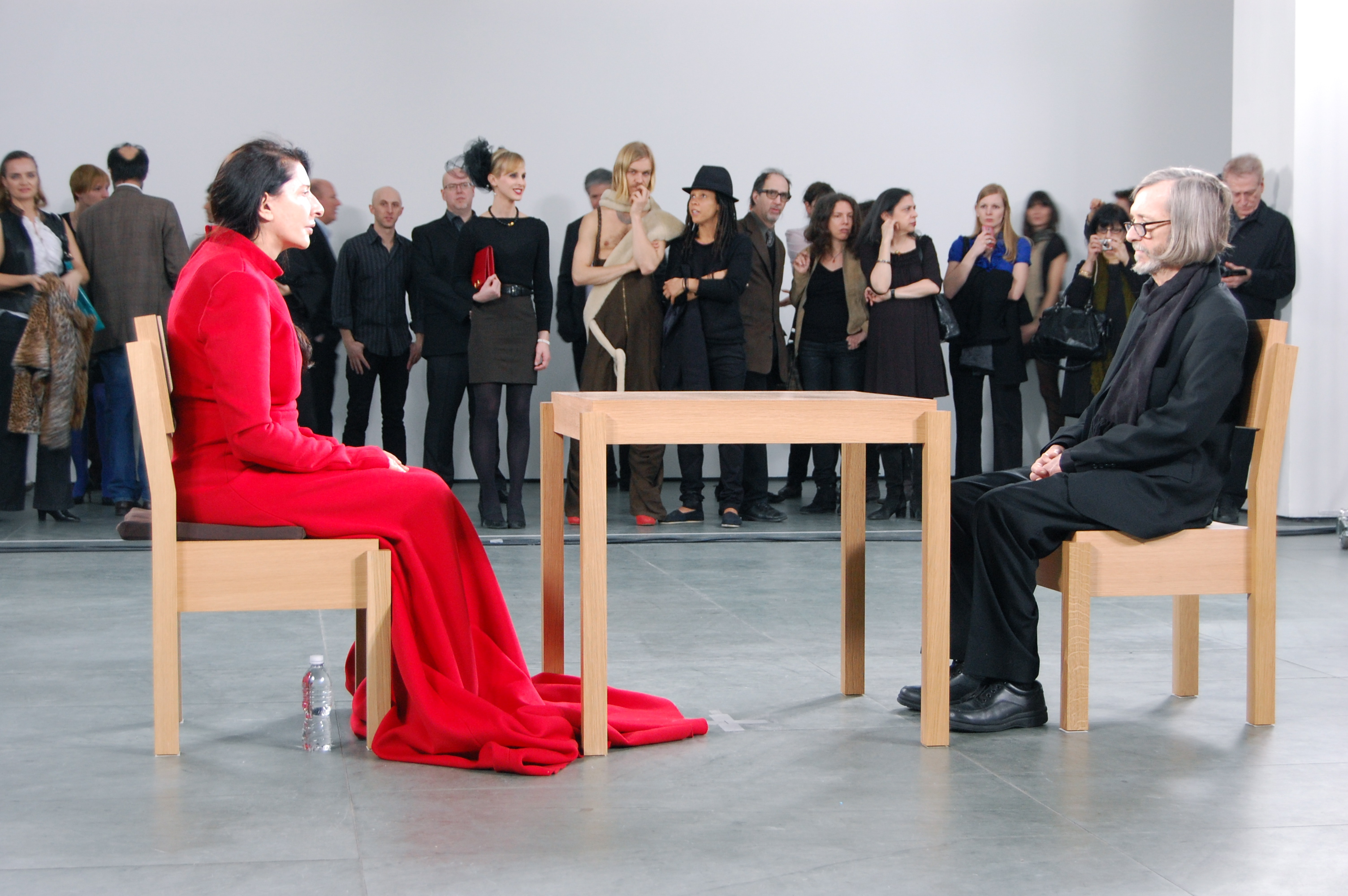
Marina Abramović's The Artist is Present, 2010, Museum of Modern Art, New York. Abramović sat silently opposite museum visitors for eight hours a day for three months, a total of 750 hours.

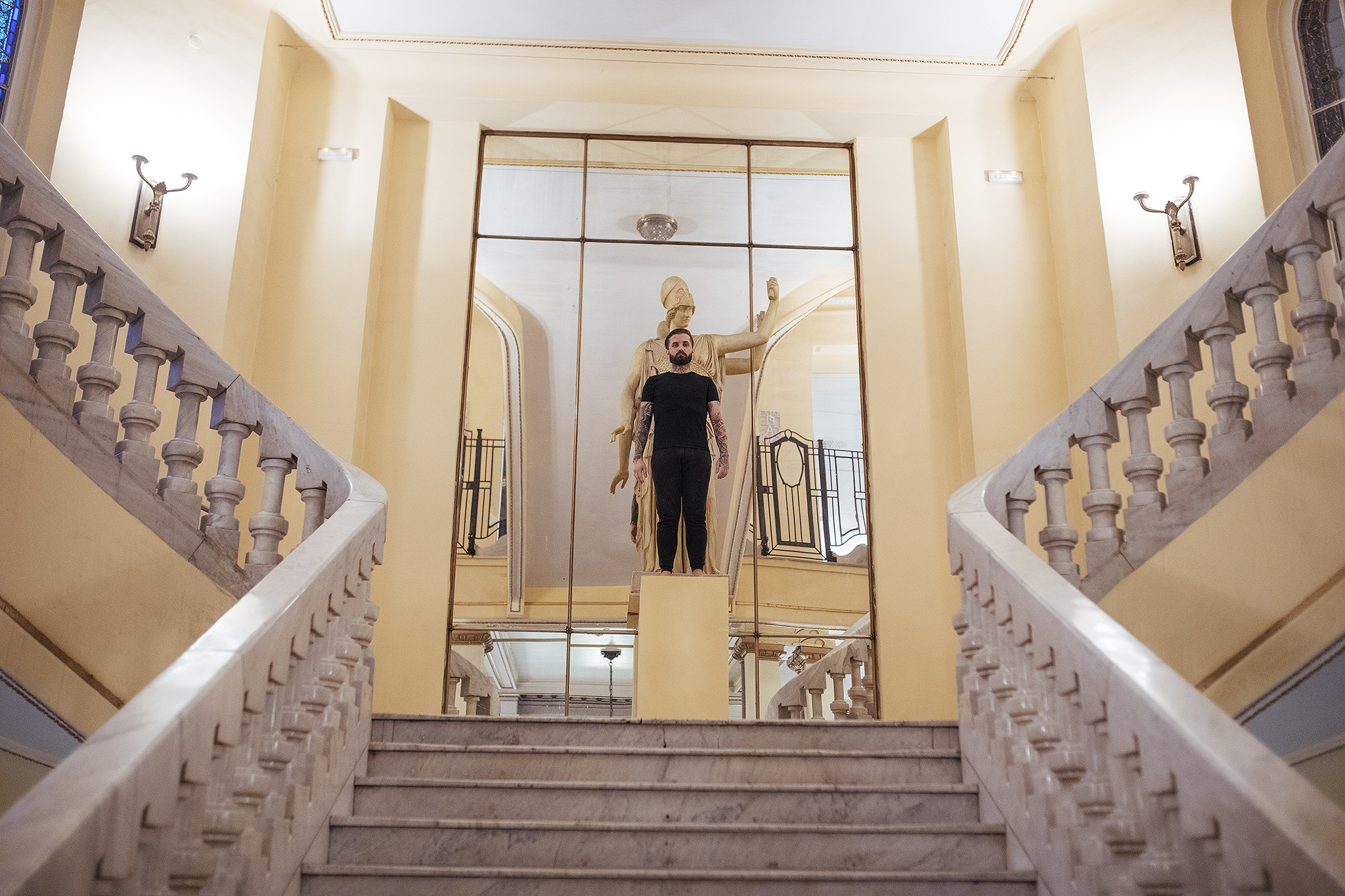
The artist Abel Azcona during The Death of The Artist at Círculo de Bellas Artes de Madrid

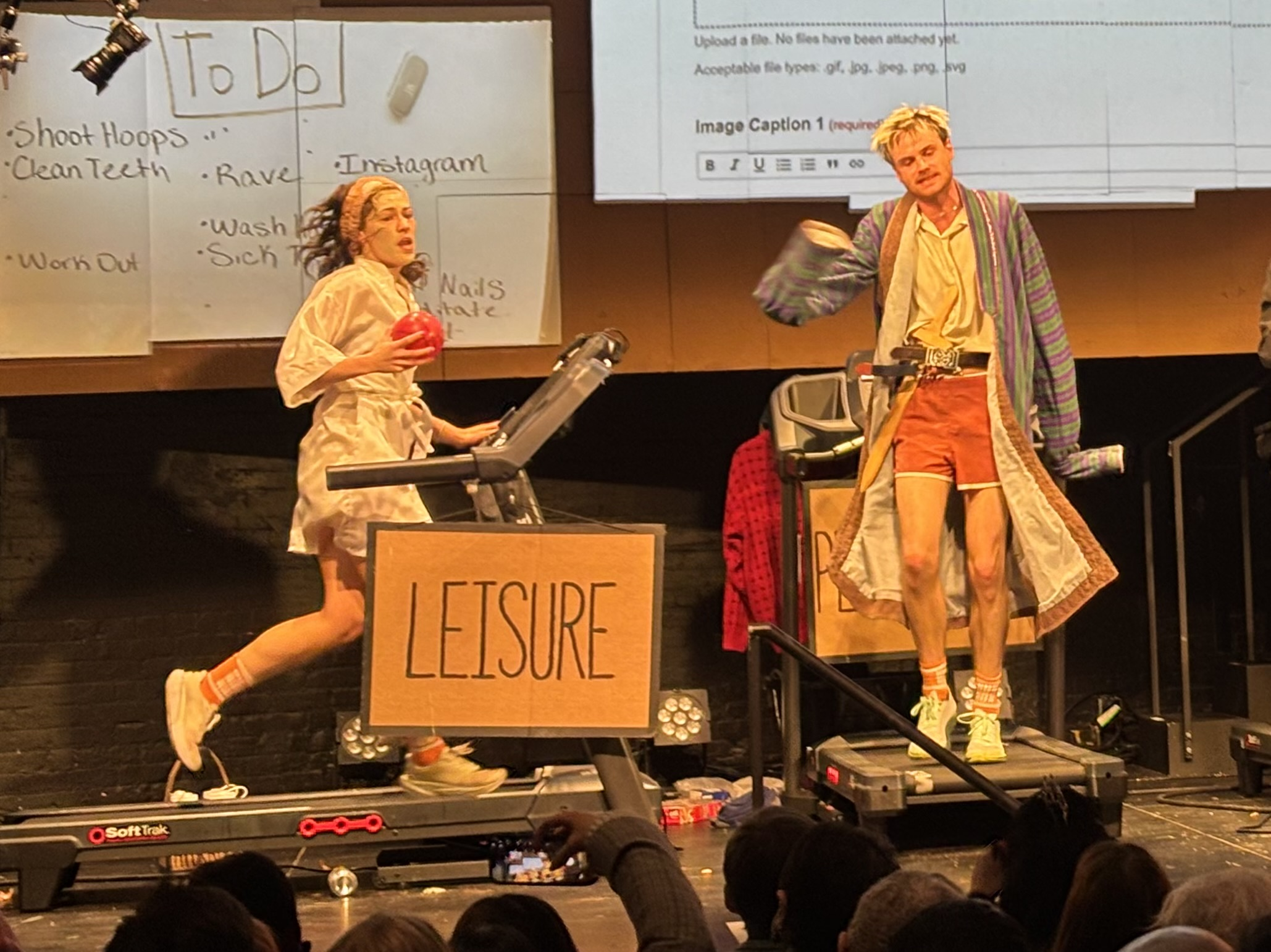
Theatre collective Pony Cam during a performance of Burnout Paradise; in a metaphor for capitalist pressures, the performers must complete increasingly difficult tasks without leaving their treadmills, or else offer full ticket refunds to the audience

Endurance art is a kind of performance art involving some form of hardship, such as pain, solitude or exhaustion. Performances that focus on the passage of long periods of time are also known as durational art or durational performances.

Human endurance contests were a fad of Depression-era United States from the 1920s–1930s. Writer Michael Fallon traces the genre of endurance art to the work of Chris Burden in California in the 1970s. Burden spent five days in a locker in Five Day Locker Piece (1971), had himself shot in Shoot (1971), and lived for 22 days in a bed in an art gallery in Bed Piece (1972).

Other examples of endurance art include Tehching Hsieh's One Year Performance 1980–1981 (Time Clock Piece), in which for 12 months he punched a time clock every hour, and Art/Life One Year Performance 1983–1984 (Rope Piece), in which Hsieh and Linda Montano spent a year tied to each other by an eight-foot (2.4 m) rope.

In The House with the Ocean View (2003), Marina Abramović lived silently for 12 days without food or entertainment on a stage entirely open to the audience. Such is the physical stamina required for some of her work that in 2012 she set up what she called a "boot camp" in Hudson, New York, for participants in her multiple-person performances.

The Nine Confinements or The Deprivation of Liberty is a conceptual, endurance art and performative work of critical and biographical content by artist Abel Azcona. The artwork was a sequence of performances carried out between 2013 and 2016. All of the series had a theme of deprivation of liberty. The first in the series was performed by Azcona in 2013 and named Confinement in Search of Identity. The artist was to remain for sixty days in a space built inside an art gallery of Madrid, with scarce food resources and in total darkness. The performance was stopped after forty-two days for health reasons and the artist hospitalised. Azcona created these works as a reflection and also a discursive interruption of his own mental illness, mental illness being one of the recurring themes in Azcona's work.

== Examples ==
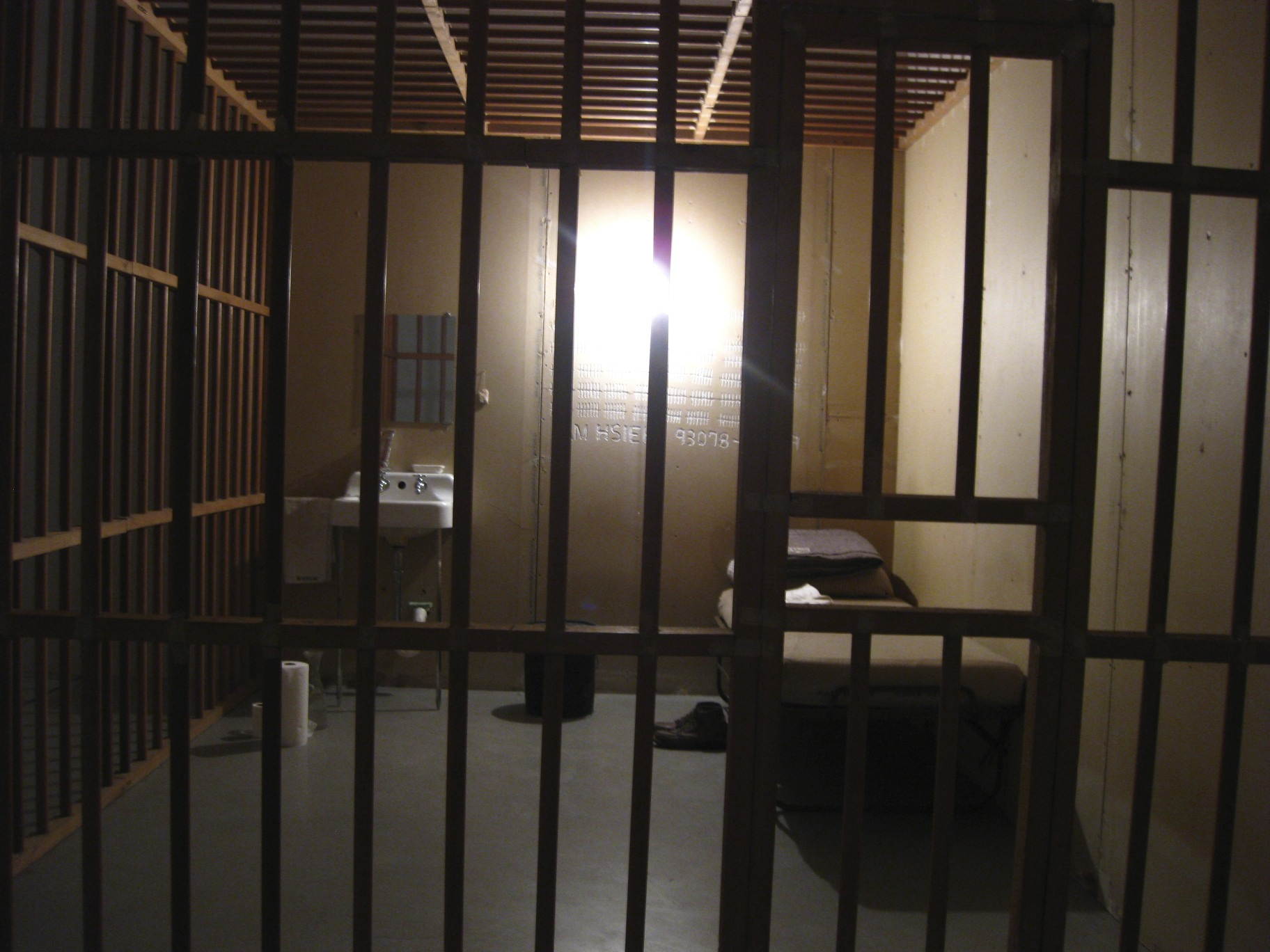
Tehching Hsieh spent a year in this cage in his studio in One Year Performance 1978–1979 (Cage Piece).

- Marina Abramović – Rhythm 0, 1974; Rhythm 5, 1974; Luminosity, 1997, 2010; Nude with Skeleton, 2002, 2005, 2010; The House With the Ocean View (2003); Balkan Erotic Epic, 2005.
- Marina Abramović with Ulay – Point of Contact, 1980; Night Sea Crossing, 1981; The Lovers: Walk on the Great Wall, 1988.
- Vito Acconci – Seedbed, 1972.
- David Askevold – Fill, 1970.
- Abel Azcona - The Death of The Artist, 2018. The Fathers, 2016. Amen or The Pederasty, 2015. Buried, 2015. Eating, 2012. The Nine Confinements or The Deprivation of Liberty, 2013-2016.
- Stuart Brisley – And for today ... nothing, 1972.
- Chris Burden – Five Day Locker Piece, 1971.
- David Blaine – Witness (1999), Buried Alive, Frozen in Time, Vertigo, Above the Below, Drowned Alive, Revolution, Electrified, Ascension.
- Nikhil Chopra, – Give Me Your Blood And I Will Give You Freedom, 2014.
- Houston Conwill – Juju Rituals, 1975–1983.
- Elevator Repair Service – Gatz, 2005.
- EJ Hill – A Monumental Offering of Potential Energy, 2016.
- Tehching Hsieh – One Year Performance 1978–1979 (Cage Piece); One Year Performance 1980–1981 (Time Clock Piece).
- Tehching Hsieh with Linda Montano – Art/Life One Year Performance 1983–1984 (Rope Piece).
- Ragnar Kjartansson – A Lot of Sorrow, 2014.
- Stan Lai – A Dream Like A Dream, 2014.
- Dani Marcel - Never smiling during the Trump presidency, 2025
- Eric Millikin – My Drinking Problem, 2016.
- Bruce Nauman – Stamping in the Studio, 1968; Revolving Upside Down, 1969.
- Bryan Lewis Saunders – Under the Influence, 2001; 30 Days Totally Blind, 2018.
- Carolee Schneeman – Up To And Including Her Limits, 1973—1976.
- Wolfgang Stoerchle – Attempt Public Erection, 1972–1975.
- Emma Sulkowicz – Mattress Performance (Carry That Weight), 2014–2015.
- Zhang Huan – 12 Square Meters, 1994.
- Benjamin Bennett – Sitting and Smiling, 2014 – 2025.
- Guido Segni – A quiet desert failure, 2013 – ongoing.
- Paul Wong – In Ten Sity, 1978.
- Nadya Tolokonnikova – Police State, 2025.
- Pony Cam - Burnout Paradise, 2023 - ongoing.

== See also ==
- Hunger artist
- Stylite
