= Urban Light =

Art installation in Los Angeles, California, United States

Coordinates: 34.063097°N 118.359221°W

- Artist: Chris Burden
- Year: 2008
- Type: Assemblage
- Dimensions: 814 cm × 1,744 cm × 1,789 cm (320.5 in × 686.5 in × 704.5 in)
- Location: Los Angeles County Museum of Art, Los Angeles, California, United States

Urban Light (2008) is a large-scale assemblage sculpture by Chris Burden located at the Wilshire Boulevard entrance to the Los Angeles County Museum of Art (LACMA). The 2008 installation consists of restored street lamps from the 1920s and 1930s. Most of them once lit the streets of Southern California.

== Description ==
Urban Light is composed of 202 street lamps arranged in a near grid. The lamps mostly came from the streets of Southern California, including Hollywood, Glendale, and Anaheim, with some from Portland, Oregon. There are 16 different streetlight models represented, many of which were commissioned for particular neighborhoods and streets. The Broadway Rose, the largest and most ornate of the models, is represented by six lamps. The style was found in downtown Los Angeles; a few can still be seen on Sixth Street between Olive and Flower Streets. The sculpture's glass globes are of three general shapes: round, acorn, and cone. The 309 LED bulbs are solar powered and switch on from dusk until dawn, governed by an astronomical timer.

Writing in the Los Angeles Times, Susan Freudenheim described the restored lamps as displaying "elaborate floral and geometric patterns" at the base, with "fluted shafts and glass globes that cap them...meticulously cleaned, painted and refurbished to create an exuberant glow."

== History ==
Burden first began collecting street lamps in December 2000 without a specific work in mind, and continued collecting them for the next seven years. He purchased his first two lamps at the Rose Bowl Flea Market at $800 each after they were pointed out by curator Paul Schimmel's son Max. The vendor, Jeff Levine, had been restoring the lamps by salvaging parts and later sold Burden more of his collection. Burden purchased others from contractor and collector Anna Justice, who was instrumental in the restoration of sandblasting, recasting missing parts, rewiring to code, and then painting a uniform grey. As Burden's collection grew, the ground around his Topanga Canyon studio became littered with parts, which the artist referred to as "lamp carcasses".

In late 2003, Burden discussed installing a hundred of the lamps at the Gagosian Gallery in New York, but the gallery eventually balked at the cost. While he later sent 14 lamps to an exhibition in London, his goal was to keep as much of his then 150-piece collection together as possible. To that end, he invited visitors to view the street lamps outside his studio, where he had installed them in dense rows on two sides of the building. Among the prospective purchasers in mid-2006 was The MAK Museum for Applied Art in Vienna and the LACMA, represented by its new director, Michael Govan. He visited the studio at twilight, and from the driveway, saw the lights lit and concluded that the installation would be a perfect fit. Govan was followed by Andrew M. Gordon, a Goldman Sachs executive who would later become chairman of the museum's board. Gordon approved the purchase through his family foundation for an undisclosed price.

The Urban Light installation took place amid changes to the LACMA campus, which included a new building, the Broad Contemporary Art Museum, and two new open spaces. The sculpture dominates one of them, a forecourt located between Wilshire Boulevard and LACMA's entry pavilion. Burden viewed his sculpture as a formal entry way to the museum on Wilshire Boulevard: "I've been driving by these buildings for 40 years, and it's always bugged me how this institution turned its back on the city."

Urban Light was preceded by Sheila Klein's Vermonica (1993), which placed 25 Los Angeles street lamps in a parking lot at the corner of Vermont Avenue and Santa Monica Boulevards.

Burden created a smaller sculpture with 24 lamps, Light of Reason, for the Rose Art Museum at Brandeis University in 2014.

Timeline
2008	Urban Light opens at LACMA.
2011	Another large Chris Burden work, the kinetic sculpture Metropolis II, opens in an adjacent building.
2012	Burden produces a model for Xanadu, another street lamp-themed installation, which would place 58 lights on every exterior ledge of the New Museum building in New York.
2015	Over a two-month period, the museum scrubs the lamps down to cast iron and applies a more durable paint deemed to have "the right sheen for the sculpture" and that meets California's volatile organic compound regulations.
2018	The museum retrofits the lamps with LED bulbs that match the intensity and color of the original incandescents. The move follows a two-year study and funding from the Leonardo DiCaprio Foundation.
2021	The Indonesian Commercial Court orders the destruction of a copy of Urban Light constructed at the Rabbit Town theme park in West Java. The ruling is in response to a 2018 copyright infringement lawsuit filed by Burden's estate.

== Critical reception ==
Los Angeles Times critic Christopher Hawthorne described Urban Light as "a kind of pop temple, deftly straddling the lines between art and architecture and between seriousness and irony. It's also a joy to walk through, but there's no getting around the fact that it turns what might have been an actual public square along Wilshire—a space defined from day to day by the people using it—into an outdoor room for one sizable and very insistent piece of art."

Hawthorne argued that Urban Light was the first of four large-scale installations at LACMA in which Michael Govan challenged and undermined "the polite axial symmetry" of the master plan he inherited from Piano and his patrons." Those installations also include Tony Smith's black aluminum sculpture, called "Smoke", that fills the atrium of the Ahmanson Building, a palm garden by Robert Irwin installed along the edge of the Resnick Pavilion, and, just north, Michael Heizer's Levitated Mass.

Christopher Bedford of the Baltimore Museum wrote that Urban Light, "embodies a civic ideal rarely realized in public art projects" that succeeds as both a social statement and public art work.

Michael Govan believed that Urban Light imparted a "feeling of walking through an ancient temple", one that echos the Greco-Roman temple facades of many East Coast museums. Those facades "are really faux; they're neoclassical,...and here [Burden has] assembled an honest-to-goodness Los Angeles temple made of local materials, in our time."

== Cultural status ==
Since its 2008 installation, Urban Light has been visited by many and widely photographed and shared on social media. Director Ivan Reitman was one of the first filmmakers to incorporate the public artwork in a motion picture, using the location for a scene in his film No Strings Attached. Echoing Burden's own view, he called the artwork "an extraordinary beacon" that "lights up a desperate part of Wilshire that felt almost abandoned at night." Urban Light was featured in the Tori Amos video Maybe California and the film Valentine's Day. The work appeared in a Guinness commercial and in a Vanity Fair article featuring cast members of the television series Glee, as well as in numerous amateur photos posted online. LACMA itself has featured the work as part of its own promotional efforts, including a 3D public service announcement preceding the film Megamind. In 2014, the sculpture was used in a dance scene in VH1's Hit the Floor. Urban Light was the setting for the last scene of the final episode of Season 2 of the television series Nobody Wants This.

The first known selfie taken at the sculpture was shot four days after the work opened and was posted to Flickr. The sculpture has its own hashtag: #urbanlight. While not rented out as a wedding site, Urban Light has been the setting for many vows.

In November 2022, mass protesters were led in a performance by Mediseh Bathaie where they were tied to the lamp posts to honor the 40th day since Khodanur Lojei's death. He was killed during the 2022 Zahedan massacre (part of the Mahsa Amini protests).
