= Vermonica =

Public art installation in Santa Monica, California, United States

- Artist: Sheila Klein
- Year: 1993
- Location: 34°05′27″N 118°17′19″W
- Preceded by: Original location at 34.09149 N -118.29085 W

Vermonica is a public art installation initiated by artist Sheila Klein in May 1993, uninstalled in November 2017 and reinstalled in a new location in December 2020. Vermonica is now located on Santa Monica Boulevard at Lyman Place, opposite the Cahuenga Branch Library.

The sculpture is named for the intersection of Santa Monica Boulevard and Vermont Avenue in East Hollywood. Some of the artwork's 25 lamp poles date to 1925, the year Los Angeles's Bureau of Street Lighting opened. Placed in front of a Rite Aid, the lights glow to illuminate the mini-mall parking lot where it was located at specific times during the night. Sheila Klein cooperated with Los Angeles businesses, bureaus, departments and neighborhoods to erect what she describes as a "formal composition" and a "drive-in museum" of street lighting. Vermonica was envisioned initially as a temporary installation with borrowed poles from the nearby streetlight yard on Santa Monica Boulevard. The sculpture was so popular that it remained in place. Vermonica precedes Chris Burden's Urban Light by 15 years.

== Work destroyed ==
On November 21, 2017, artist Sheila Klein was informed by a member of the public that her artwork had been removed without her knowledge. The elements of the work had been moved to the front lawn of the Bureau of Street Lighting, and reinstalled in a curved line. In a statement, Sheila Klein announced that the reinstalled work is not Vermonica.

An assistant director with the Bureau of Street Lighting said the move is not permanent and was necessitated by construction work in the parking lot where the sculpture was originally located. "Our sense of urgency was to protect and preserve the streetlights so that they wouldn't be damaged or removed by someone other than us," Assistant Director Megan Hackney told The Los Angeles Times.

== City emails discovered, petition launched, restoration announced and completed ==
On June 6, 2019, artist Sheila Klein launched a petition seeking restoration of Vermonica in light of newly discovered emails from Bureau of Street Lighting staff that show that BSL intentionally dismantled Vermonica to create a new city staff designed work they called "Virmonica" (as the installation is now near the corner of Santa Monica Boulevard and Virgil Avenue).

On January 1, 2020, artist Sheila Klein announced on Instagram that an agreement had been reached with the City of Los Angeles for her to restore Vermonica. The newly reinstalled sculpture was completed and re-lit by the artist on December 1, 2020.
