= 747 =

747 may refer to:

- 747 (number), a composite number
- AD 747, a year of the Julian calendar
- 747 BC, a year in the 8th century BC
- Boeing 747, the first wide-body passenger airplane

== Arts and media ==
- 747s (band), an English indie band
- 747 (album), by country music band Lady Antebellum (now Lady A) (2014)
- "747" (song), by Swedish rock band Kent (1998)
- "747 (Strangers in the Night)", a song by British heavy metal band Saxon from their 1980 album Wheels of Steel
- 747, UK title for 1998 made-for-television movie Blackout Effect
- 747 (performance art), a performance art piece by Chris Burden

== Other uses ==
- Area code 747, a telephone area code in California
- Big Bud 747, the world's largest farm tractor
- Swingline 747, a model of office stapler
- 747 Aberdeen Airport–Peterhead, a bus route in Scotland
- FC Pskov-747, Russian football club
- List of highways numbered 747
- 747 Montreal-Trudeau/Downtown, Montreal Transit airport shuttle bus route
- 747, a(n) (in)famous code in StarTropics that's needed to continue the game past a certain point
