= Rhythm 0 =

1974 endurance art by Marina Abramović

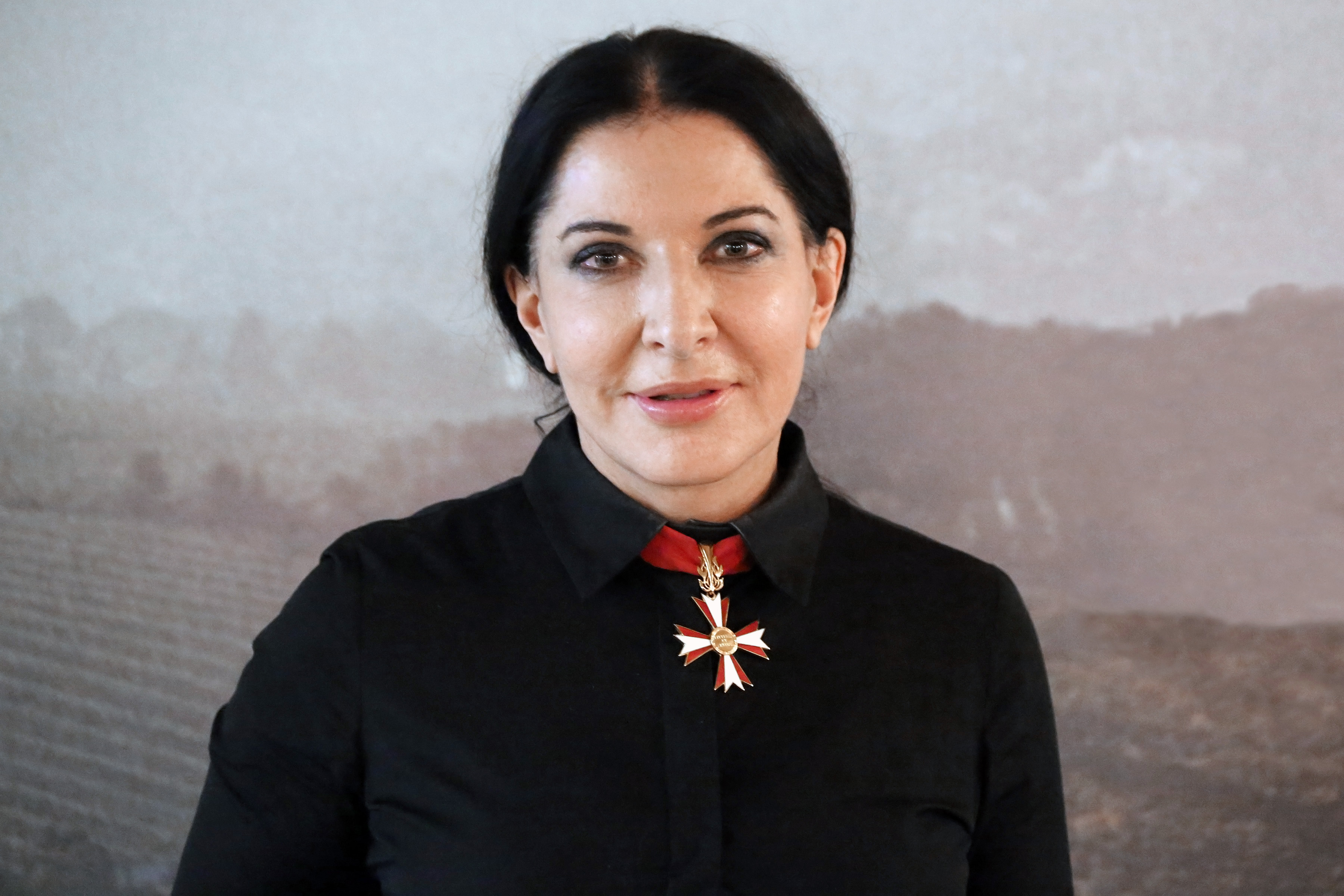
Abramović in 2012

Rhythm 0 was a six-hour-long endurance art performance by the Serbian performance artist Marina Abramović performed in the Galleria Studio Morra in Naples in 1974. This was the final performance of Abramović's Rhythm Series, following four previous performances that took place throughout 1973–1974. The work involved Abramović standing still while the audience was invited to do to her whatever they wished, using one of 72 objects she had placed on a table. The items were specifically chosen to represent objects of both pleasure and pain. Some of items were a rose, a feather, perfume, honey, bread, grapes, wine, scissors, a scalpel, nails, a metal bar, a gun, and a bullet.

There were no separate stages. Abramović and the visitors stood in the same space, making it clear that the latter were part of the work. She said the purpose of the piece was to find out, when given the opportunity, how far the public would go: "What is the public about and what are they going to do in this kind of situation?"

== Performance ==
Her instructions were:

Instructions:
There are 72 objects on the table that one can use on me as desired.
Performance.
I am the object...
During this period I take full responsibility.

Duration: 6 hours (8 pm – 2 am).

Abramović said the work "pushed her body to the limits". Visitors were gentle to begin with, offering her a rose or a kiss. Art critic Thomas McEvilley, who was present, wrote:

It began tamely. Someone turned her around. Someone thrust her arms into the air. Someone touched her somewhat intimately. The Neapolitan night began to heat up. In the third hour all her clothes were cut from her with razor sharp blades. In the fourth hour the same blades began to explore her skin. Her throat was slashed so someone could suck her blood. Various minor sexual assaults were carried out on her body. She was so committed to the piece that she would not have resisted rape or murder. Faced with her abdication of will, with its implied collapse of human psychology, a protective group began to define itself in the audience. When a loaded gun was thrust to Marina's head and her own finger was being worked around the trigger, a fight broke out between the audience factions, and the small protective group gathered around her in a circle to protect her.

As Abramović described it later: "What I learned was that ... if you leave it up to the audience, they can kill you ... I felt really violated: they cut up my clothes, stuck rose thorns in my stomach, one person aimed the gun at my head, and another took it away. It created an aggressive atmosphere. After exactly 6 hours, as planned, I stood up and started walking toward the audience. Everyone ran away, to escape an actual confrontation." In the work, Abramović explored the physical and mental limits of her being. She withstood pain, exhaustion, and danger in her exploration of an emotional and spiritual transformation. This performance was inspired by the contradictions of her childhood: both parents were high-ranking officials in the socialist government, while her grandmother, with whom she had lived, was devoutly Serbian Orthodox.

== Reception ==
Rhythm 0, along with another of Abramović's performances, The Artist Is Present, ranked ninth among the all-time best performance art pieces in a 2013 list by Complex magazine. The magazine discussed the two pieces' ability to create a relationship between performer and audience, despite the opposing power dynamics of both pieces. Complex magazine credits Abramović for popularizing performance art to "pop-star standards".

In 2023, The Guardian revisited Abramovic’s work and its continuing relevance today: "As some of the reviews of her RA show revealed, Abramović’s performance art practice still invites scepticism, even disgust—reactions to which she is long accustomed. She told me: 'When I started in the early 70s, everyone said we were crazy. "This is not art, it's nothing"'. By using the body as her medium, Abramović shows just how close art can get to life. As spectators of her work, we are also implicated in the reality of what people endure. Rhythm 0 is a shattering reminder of the people who live in fear of abuse daily."

Also in 2023, The Harvard Crimson notes in regards to the audience's reception of the piece: "One of the main reactions the audience members aimed to elicit was fear, reflecting the power dynamics at play between the artist and the audience. The audience members were aware that there would be no consequences for their actions against Abramović. This lack of consequence contributed to their increased willingness to use the objects in more extreme ways."

== See also ==
- Cut Piece 1964
- The Death of The Artist
- Empathy and Prostitution
- Endurance art
- Milgram experiment
- Stanford prison experiment
