= Luminosity (performance art) =

Performance artwork by Marina Abramović

Luminosity (1997) was a performance art installation by Serbian artist Marina Abramović at Sean Kelly Gallery, New York. Along with Insomnia and Dissolution, Luminosity formed part of a larger work by Abramović called Spirit House.

In Luminosity, Abramović appears nude, balancing herself on a bicycle seat on a pedestal apparatus, mounted high on the wall. The artist keeps her arms and legs fully extended, evoking Leonardo da Vinci's Vitruvian Man. However, this posture places painful pressure where her genitals make contact with the seat. Throughout the performance, the artist is bathed in light of changing intensity.

Luminosity is considered an example of endurance art. The work was reperformed continually, in shifts, by the artist's trainees for 700 hours during the retrospective exhibition, Marina Abramović: The Artist Is Present at the Museum of Modern Art in 2010.

== See also ==
- Endurance art
- Avant-garde
- Experimental theatre
