= Cut Piece 1964 =

Performance art by Yoko Ono

Cut Piece 1964 is a piece of performance art and participatory work conceived of and first performed by Japanese-American multimedia avant-garde artist, musician and peace activist Yoko Ono on July 20, 1964, at the Yamaichi Concert Hall in Kyoto, Japan. It is one of the earliest and most significant works of the feminist art movement and Fluxus.

Ono has performed the work a total of six times. Based on one of her event scores, a set of instructions for a performance, Ono sat down on the stage, laid a pair of scissors in front of her and invited the audience to cut pieces of her clothing off. Cut Piece is understood to address materialism, gender, class, memory and cultural identity and has become regarded as an iconic proto-feminist work of performance art, but also has an underlying anti-war message and inspiration found in Zen and Shinto Buddhism. In addition to Ono's six performances, Cut Piece has been staged by other artists and has inspired feminist and anti-war artists and collectives since it was first performed in 1964.

Ono initially performed Cut Piece in Kyoto and Tokyo in the summer of 1964. A third performance was presented at the Carnegie Recital Hall in New York in March 1965, the fourth and fifth performances were at the Africa Centre in London in September 1966, and sixth, and to date last, was in September 2003 in Paris.

== Description and general interpretations ==
Cut Piece started as an event score composed by Yoko Ono, and is one of her best known works. First performed in 1964, the piece is considered an early example of performance art. Part of the intention behind her event scores is that the work may be performed by anyone, and Cut Piece has been performed by many artists of both genders. The score instructs the performer to sit onstage and remain motionless as audience members approach and cut pieces from the performer's clothing. Important to the creation of meaning in Cut Piece is the idea of reception theory, the idea that the viewer plays as much of a role in investing a work of art with meaning as the artist does. Indeed, because of the work's relative ambiguity, it elicits many readings, some intended by Ono herself and others inferred by the audience, other artists and historians considering gender, national identity, memory and historical context. Based on the nature of the interaction between Ono and audience members during performances in New York and London, many have interpreted it as a proto-feminist work addressing issues of gender-based violence and objectification and subjugation of women.

Cut Piece also explores the relationship between artist, artwork, and viewer. The work raises questions about the relationship between audience and artist, basically by making the audience into collaborators. Because of the ambiguity and potential for chance, there is an opening that allows for the creation of multiple meanings. Each performance varies based on the tenor of the audience. Some performances move slowly and others at a quick pace. Some people cut gently and others are more aggressive. In 1966 she wrote about her experience of the London performance, "People went on cutting the parts they do not like of me. Finally there was only the stone remained of me that was in me but they were still not satisfied and wanted to know what it’s like in the stone."

According to Julia Bryan-Wilson, Cut Piece consists of three interlinking gestures: the invitation, the sacrifice, and the souvenir. The invitation happens when Ono invites the audience to participate, in fact to perform the piece by approaching the stage and cutting a piece of her clothing. Ono has said that she always wore an outfit of her best clothing for the performance so it would be a true offering. This surrender of Ono to the audience's cutting signifies the sacrifice. The souvenir lies in the audience being asked to keep the piece of fabric, or as in the 2003 performance, to send it to a loved one, an act of sharing and continuing remembrance.

== Event score ==
The event score for Cut Piece was printed in the program for the Yoko Ono Farewell Concert: Striptease Show at the Sogetsu Kaikan Hall in Tokyo in 1964, along with scores of several other works performed that night. The score was also included in her 1964 book, Grapefruit.

Cut Piece average time: 30'

First Version for single performer:

Performer sits on stage with a pair of scissors in front of him.

It is announced that members of the audience may come on stage – one at a time – to cut a small piece of the performer's clothing to take with them.

Performer remains motionless throughout the piece.

Piece ends at the performer's option.

Second version for audience:

It is announced that members of the audience may cut each other's clothing.

The audience may cut as long as they want.

An addition is made to the score published in the 1971 reprint of Grapefruit adding that "the performer, however, does not have to be a woman". While there are two versions here, Ono seems to have only staged iterations of Version 1, which is the most well known version.

== Performance art and relationship between performer and audience ==
In performance art the artist or performer assumes the role of the art object. In most performances, there is an implied mutually understood relationship between the spectator and performer. Cut Piece is unique in that this agreement is constantly negotiated because of the intense level of audience participation and direct interaction with the performer required, and there is always the threat that one party can overstep the agreed-upon boundaries. Cut Piece effectively inverts the relationship of performer and spectator. In Cut Piece, Ono remains passive and silent and the audience is invited to cut away a piece of her clothing. In order for the work to be successful the audience must participate, making them responsible for their own experience, and indeed for the progression and tone of the performance as well.

In this work Ono assumes the role of an "othered" exotic body as well as victimized woman. Cut Piece partially relies on the audience members and their participation to create meaning in the work, which is where the success of the work lies: in the ambiguity and shifting meanings found in the work through revisiting the various performances and the different way in which the audience interacts with Ono and one another. In fact, Cut Piece redefines the relationship of and blurs the roles of the performing body and interpreting audience by essentially turning the audience into performers themselves. In the case of Cut Piece, the work would not be possible to stage without the mutual performance between the artist and audience. Ono is eliciting a specific performance from the audience members through her instructions, the atmosphere and context she has constructed for the event to take place in. This mode of performance most likely would have been completely new to the audience during the time of the first stagings of the piece in 1964.

Documentation also played an important role in the future reception of Cut Piece and our understanding of the artist/audience relationship. During all of the performances, Ono invited photographers and filmmakers to document it. This differs from other performance artists of this era who wished for their work to remain ephemeral, only existing in the time frame that they were performed in. Since Ono's work is concerned with memory, memorializing the event and carrying this memory into the future, the documentation of the work and the power of the photograph to carry the message forward was important to the work.

As Clare Johnson notes, many of the photos of the event depict a calmly seated Ono while an audience member snips a small piece of her clothing away. However, the photos and film by the Maysles brothers also remind the viewer of the potential for violence during the performance due to the uncertain relationship between viewer and artist. The photos "contribute to the interpretation of this work as primarily about gendered violence". Ono's control is asserted through her calmness and stillness. She creates a space of possibility and the camera was an integral part of it, serving not only to document but as a mediator between the artist and audience in the present of the performances.

== Performances ==
The six performances of Cut Piece differ based on the location and the audience participation. Because of its multiple iterations and the manner in which each performance changes based on the context of time, place, audience and artist's intention, Clare Johnson has described Cut Piece as representing a "series of present tenses".

=== Kyoto 1964 ===
The first performance of Cut Piece was staged in Kyoto on July 20, 1964, at Yamaichi Hall in Kyoto, and was part of an evening of performances by Ono, Anthony Cox and Al Wunderlich, titled Contemporary Avant-Garde Music Concert: Insound and Instructure. In the program, Ono identified herself as an "American avant-garde musician".

Ono sat alone cross-legged on the stage in her best clothes, her long hair draped over her shoulders. The audience took turns walking up to her on stage and joining her performance, cutting off pieces of her clothing with scissors. Her expression was kept poised and silenced while her body remained motionless. For the final stage of the performance, her body was fully exposed. The audience walked down the steps clutching the remnants of her clothes and they were allowed to keep these pieces with them. As a pioneering work, Ono places the viewer in a very important position and is an important element of Cut Piece.

She performed other works that night including Fly Piece and Word of Mouth Piece, two other conceptual performances that also required the audience to participate. These pieces prepared the audience to participate in Cut Piece, engaging them in the making of the work by involving them in low stakes, often whimsical or fun activities requiring a spirit of fantasy, interaction, and imagination.

Ono recalls the long silences during that first performance and how it was difficult for people to approach the stage. There was one instance of potential violence when an audience member held the scissors out as if he would stab her. Jieun Rhee questions if this rage was directed toward Ono as a woman or as an American during a time of Japanese ambivalence toward the US due to post-war politics.

=== Tokyo 1964 ===
The second performance was held in Tokyo at Sogetsu Kaikan Hall on August 11, 1964, again performing with Tony Cox as well as fellow Fluxus artist Jeff Perkins, for the Yoko Ono Farewell Concert: Striptease Show. Also listed on the program was Sproutmotional Whisper as well as an advertisement for her new book Grapefruit. She later said the Striptease in the performance title referred to a "stripping of the mind" in her 1966 essay "To the Wesleyan People (Who Attended the Meeting)". Additionally, in an interview she gave shortly before leaving Japan, Ono opined that "what a human really wants to express is a striptease, and this is also the apogee of the arts". Perhaps the physical baring of her body to the viewer, and ultimately the baring of the artist's soul through their work, is related to the intention of giving that she wished to express in Cut Piece.

=== New York 1965 ===
Ono performed Cut Piece for the third time at Carnegie Recital Hall in New York City on March 21, 1965, in New Works of Yoko Ono. The response of the audience at the New York performance seemed to differ drastically from those in Japan. The performance was captured on film by documentarians Albert and David Maysles.

Spectators approach without hesitation. Some make their cuts quickly, while others work on their cutting for a long time. Women tend to take more care and cut small pieces from discreet areas, such as the edges of sleeves or back of the neckline. At a certain point Ono's breath quickens and she looks nervous. The audience chuckles throughout, and their ambient noises and muffled speech are the only sounds in the video.

Around the 7:30 mark, a man comes up for the second time, the first time having clipped a part of Ono's shirt from over her breast. He begins roughly cutting the blouse down the front between her breasts. He narrates his actions to the audience, saying that it will take a while, but not that long. At one point Ono reaches out to stop him, but restrains herself. The man continues until he has cut away the blouse and proceeds to cut through her bra straps. A woman says "stop being such a dweeb". At this point Ono holds her hands around her breasts to keep the bra front from falling. The film ends shortly after.

=== London 1966 ===
The fourth and fifth iterations of Cut Piece were performed over two evenings as part of the Destruction of Art Symposium on September 9 and 10, 1966 at the Africa Centre in London. The symposium was organized by artist and activist Gustav Metzger and was aligned with leftist politics and cultural protest. Metzger commented about Cut Piece, "It was better than I expected. Stronger. And very disturbing." The inclusion of Cut Piece in this symposium situated the work in the context of protest.

=== Paris 2003 ===
37 years after her 1966 performances, Ono staged a sixth performance of Cut Piece in 2003 in Paris at the Théâtre le Ranelagh, two years after the September 11 World Trade Center attacks in New York and the same year US troops invaded Iraq. This performance included the additional instructions of sending a postcard sized cloth fragment to a loved one as a sign of reconciliation. This new gesture signifies an ongoing temporality, extending the performance beyond its container and into the future, as the potentially violent act of cutting becomes about mending. This iteration of the performance brings the anti-war message and the emphasis on the creation of future memory through commemoration of the past more clearly into focus.

After nearly 40 years, when she reprised Cut Piece, her mindset was also very different from when she first performed it. Ono said, "Force and intimidation were in the air. People were silenced. Cut Piece is my hope for world peace. When I first performed this work, in 1964, I did it with some anger and turbulence in my heart." At the same time, she spoke on stage, "Come and cut a piece of my clothing wherever you like – the size of less than a postcard – and send it to the one you love."

== Shinto Buddhism, clothing and the power of giving ==
Ono has said the original intention of the piece was about the power of giving and letting go of ego, saying, "Instead of giving the audience what the artist chooses to give, the artist gives what the audience chooses to take." She goes on to say that during the performances, she was staring into space as if praying, and felt like she was willingly sacrificing herself. Ono has cited Buddhist stories, specifically the story of Jataka, or the Hungry Tigress, as an inspiration for Cut Piece and the spirit of ultimate giving and surrender she intended for the performances. In the story, the Buddha gave to the world anything that was asked of him, even to the point of allowing a female tiger to consume his body so that she could produce milk for her cubs. In a 2000 interview she adds that Cut Piece reflected how she felt after the brutal criticism she received about a Tokyo exhibition of her work. "There were many things that were done to me at the time, and I kept fighting," she recalls.

In the context of Shinto Buddhism, which was an inspiration to Ono that Japanese viewers would have been familiar with, exists the intertwining of the sexual and spiritual. Ono's statement about the artist who "gives what the audience chooses to take" harkens to ancient Shinto practices, including those of the Kumano bikuni, a group of nuns who traveled around giving sermons and also engaging in prostitution as a way to raise funds which can be seen as "female 'giving' in service of a higher goal".

Interesting as well is the association of clothing with the wearer's spirit in Japanese spiritual tradition. According to Liza Dalby, in Japan, clothing is so closely associated with the wearer that the garment becomes imbued with the essence of a person's spirit. The concept of kami, referring to "the spiritualization of all things in the universe", as well as the spiritualization of the object, or mono, help us to understand the reverence expressed by the audience in the Kyoto and Tokyo performances as well as the significance of the destruction of Western clothing as a representation of the tension between Japan and the West. Considering clothing in the context of kami and "the power of giving" means that each person who cuts is cutting away and taking a piece of her soul. This can be seen as both a violent act as well as something like an act of communion, where Ono has offered her clothing and therefore her spirit as a token of commemoration.

== Race and culture ==
Ono's own framing of identity in the performances, meant she played an exotic body in both the Eastern and Western settings. The exploration of otherness in Cut Piece fed into the expectations and exposed feelings that each audience had about the other. In the case of the Japanese audience, it fed into their expectations and anger towards Americans or towards Ono as a Japanese person who was now identifying as American. Whereas in the New York and London performances it fed into the stereotypes and sexual fantasies about Japanese women.

The reaction of the Japanese audience is in stark contrast with the performances at Carnegie Hall in 1965 and at London's Africa Center in 1966, where Ono presented herself as a Japanese traditional artist and was seen as a "young Oriental lady" by the audience as evidenced in a review by Alaster Niven. In both of these performances it seems that the audience received the work as a striptease, the "exposure of an exotic female body".

It sounds like, aside from one male spectator who menaces her with the scissors, from Ono's own recollection there was reverence and care from the audiences in Japan. Ono described the audience as slowly cutting her clothes "with quiet and beautiful movements". In photos and recordings of the performances, it is observed that Ono always sat in a low kneeling position on the stage, the formal seiza sitting position, which signified politeness and would have been recognized as such in Japan. This same seated position in the New York and London performances might have played into the Western fetishization of a silent and submissive Asian woman, further twisting and complicating the power dynamics present in the work. Clare Johnson observes that Ono gave the audience the opportunity to enact the power dynamic implicit in this fantasy, in a way performing "the objectification of the Asian other". However, in the New York iteration, the male audience members feel almost too confident in exercising control and ownership over her body. In the short 8 minute film, there were multiple moments of near hostility, to the point where some viewers have felt they are witnessing a possible assault.

Jieun Rhee posits that in her performances of Cut Piece in Japan, Ono had a "strategy for the West", one that would allow her to shift from her identity as an "American avant-garde musician" into that of a "traditional Japanese artist", using her dual and fluid identities to create context and an adversarial or othered relationship between the artist/performer and the audience in both cases, noting that the work is a well thought framing of the friction between Japanese and American culture, the post war context, and gender. As a woman who challenged the traditional role of a Japanese woman, and as only one of a few women involved in the Japanese avant-garde, Ono endured the brunt of Japanese patriarchal attitudes and it became difficult for her to find acceptance in the male dominated art world, which was most likely a reason for her departure back to the US in 1964 after her two performances of Cut Piece.

== Feminist reading ==
Feminist readings of Cut Piece often center on the feminist concept of the "gaze", referring to the objectification of the female body and the violence enacted upon it "mediated by regimes of vision". In this context the work addresses voyeurism, sexual aggression, gender subordination, violation of personal space, violence against women. Cut Piece is the first performance piece to address the potential for sexual violence in public spectacle. When asked about the feminism of Cut Piece, Ono said she "didn’t have any notion of feminism". However, as a woman functioning in the male-dominated, misogynistic art world of the 1960s, she certainly would have been aware of the power dynamics of gender and subordination of women that would eventually spark the women's liberation movement and she has not objected to the feminist readings of her work.

Contained within the performance space is the potential for violence where the audience is the male aggressor and Ono is playing the role of female victim. This reading takes Ono's body as a stand-in for all female bodies and considers her as the objectified female art object to be powerless, subjected to the violence and scrutiny of the audience's gaze. Watching some of the male audience members in the film of the performance is quite harrowing and one can see why the work has become such an important feminist work in relation to these issues. During at least one of the London performances, Ono was stripped completely nude. The power dynamic present in the New York performance was heightened in the London performance where, based on an account by critic Alaster Niven, it sounds like a master of ceremonies prompted the audience throughout, even asking someone to remove the last strip of Ono's underwear. Even though Ono remains silent as part of the parameters of Cut Piece, the fact that a male host spoke for her in this iteration of the work functions to silence and objectify her even further. Perhaps it is moments like these that have prompted some viewers to describe Cut Piece as "more like a rape than an art performance".

The threat of potential violence within Cut Piece is palpable, and the feminist readings valid, however this reading often overlooks the interplay of gender with Ono's personal identity and history in a way that can expand on it even further. According to Julia Bryan-Wilson, in Cut Piece the body can be read as a recipient of risk and threats but also as a source of gifts. She asserts that Ono actually retains her agency by instructing the audience in what to do with the scissors, as well as asserts her right to end the performance "at the option of the performer". She also does take control at certain points, such as during the New York performance, after a particularly harrowing interaction with an audience member who cuts away her entire top and cuts through the straps of her bra, she moves her arms to prevent the remains from falling and her breasts from being exposed. Her actions in Cut Piece differ from later feminist works, albeit inspired by Cut Piece, such as Marina Abromović's Rhythm 0 (1974), where the artist fully surrendered to the audience's whims and desires during a six hour long event where audience members had a choice of 72 objects including nails, lipstick, matches and a gun.

Calling back to the idea of a woman giving a piece of her soul, or allowing it to be taken via the cutting of clothing also relates to feminist theory and expectations put upon women to sacrifice everything in service of the caretaking duties of motherhood. Ono has stated that "women [are] the only people who know the pride and joy of surrender". This can be related to a type of freedom of joy felt in the act of true surrender, however the concept of surrender in relation to Cut Piece could also refer to an expectation of passiveness or submission of women in traditional gender roles as wife, mother and caretaker. This too requires a surrender to circumstances, to power dynamics, to male dominance.

In the context of giving that Ono states was her original intention as well as the concept of the sacrifice, both a part of the Buddhist myth that inspired Ono as well as Julia Bryan-Wilson's analysis of sacrifice as an important part of the work, it is perhaps important to consider that a major part of the performance for Ono was being committed to continue 'giving' to the audience "whatever they wanted to take", even when the taking is not always gracious or gentle. The reckoning of violence and generosity inherent in the piece is important to both the feminist and anti-war readings of it.

== Anti-war reading ==
The piece can also be read as a protest against war and specifically responding to the events of World War II, including the experience of Ono's own family. This reading is particularly relevant in light of Ono's lifelong anti-war activism. Cut Piece can be examined in the context of the massive devastation of the bombings of Hiroshima and Nagasaki and its aftermath as well as the impending violence of the Vietnam War which would soon dominate global consciousness. Both events ignored any distinction between civilian and combatant, where the majority of civilian casualties were women and children. This reading expands upon the general feminist perspective of "undressing as violence" and opens the work to a broader feminism that understands war as a deeply feminist issue and considers the "circulation of the female body within global politics". Bringing the atrocities of war and the emotional and material consequences suffered by its victims into the realm of feminist concern opens the discourse up to discussions about not only violence inflicted upon the individual but the devastation inflicted upon a collective population and the impact of war on women.

After the bombings, the US military documented the devastation and the effects on survivors, which included many photos of people whose clothing had been partially tattered by the explosion. Originally suppressed, these images as well as survivor accounts were made public and some of the actual clothing was displayed in museums. This was accompanied by an outpouring of personal accounts and artwork made by hibakusha, the Japanese survivors of atomic war, much of which depicted torn clothing. These images are precedents of Cut Piece, and Ono's body in the work can be seen as being in dialogue with them. The cutting involved in Cut Piece, reducing Ono's clothing to tatters, as she sits steadfast in her offering, is a living and changing reenactment of the violence of the nuclear blasts, which functions as an act of remembrance. By leaving the participants with the souvenir of the fabric they cut away, it is a hopeful gesture of reparation as well as a token of memory, something to keep them from forgetting. In this context, "Ono’s art presents not the female survivor as injured, but the survivor as witness – not the body as an authentic source of pain and experience, but as mediated by history and its effects.

The giving and remembering involved in Cut Piece is reflective of the optimism inherent in many of her works such as Promise Piece (1966) and Morning Piece (1964), which, like Cut Piece, both employ notions of memorialization and leave the audience with commemorative objects, the souvenirs, that also serve to include the viewer in the history of the event and tasks them with constructing memory. This act of giving and receiving connects past, present and future and makes the viewer/ participant into a bearer of memory. The optimism, however tainted with the violence of the past, evokes a promise for the future, if we can avoid future war and violence. The fragments from these performances serve as reminders of the devastation of that violence. The anti-war readings give space for the work to function as "a gesture of reparation and a ritual of remembrance" as well as to explore the complex relationship between aggression and generosity in the work. Ono's later 2003 performance makes this aspect of the work more clear, as she explicitly states her intention of spreading peace and reconciliation in the aftermath of the 9/11 terror attacks and impending war through sharing an artifact of the performance, a scrap of her clothing.

== Reflection ==
Cut Piece caused a sensation and inspired much discussion. After its initial performance, Ono mentioned that one of the purposes of the show was to share and give a part of her best. That's why she chose to wear her best suit. In one of her early interviews, she said, "It was a form of giving, giving and taking. It was a kind of criticism against artists, who are always giving what they want to give. I wanted people to take whatever they wanted to, so it was very important to say you can cut wherever you want to." And she also mentioned that part of her inspiration came from Buddhism.

Paradoxically, Cut Piece is a classic and universally recognized feminist work in public. In a 1994 interview, Ono denied that she had feminist ideas when she first performed it. In the performance, she invites deeper reflection than just revealing the connection between the performer (the object) and the audience. She creates her relationship with the audience by giving them the opportunity to participate in the performance as well as to gaze at the work and ponder it from their own perspective.

Cut Piece boldly presents violence against women's bodies in the form of cut-out clothes. Most people define this as feminist performance art. But Ono remains ambiguous about it, almost entirely giving the viewer the responsibility and right to judge the work. Performing the piece made Ono famous, yet it sparked much controversy. Thomas E. Crow commended in 1966, "it is difficult to think of an earlier work of art that so acutely pinpoints the political question of women’s physical vulnerability as mediated by regimes of vision." Writing in 1994, Marcia Tanner critiqued Cut Piece as "really quite gruesome—more like a rape than an art performance." She argues that the work is full of aggression and violence against women and is deliberately passive and sexually controlling. Ono is reduced to an object to be scrutinized, violated by the audience, and subjected to the male gaze. At the same time, the audience's role changes from voyeur to victimizer, sadist and aggressor, being dangerous and threatening.
