= Burnout Paradise (theatre) =

2023 performance art work

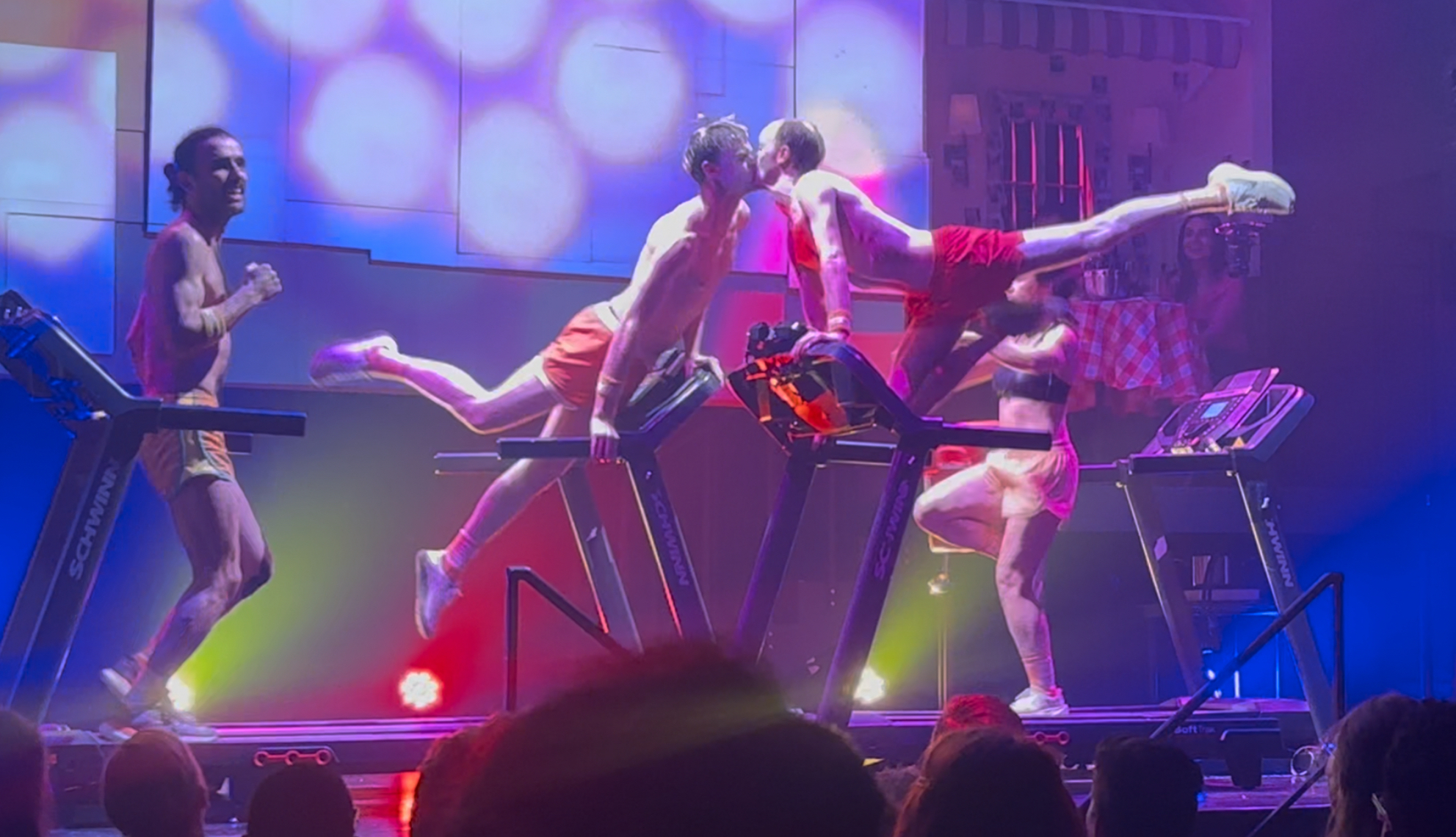
- A performance of Burnout Paradise in 2026
- Premiere: October 2023: Melbourne Fringe Festival, Australia
- Productions: 2023 Melbourne; 2024 North America & Ireland Tour; 2026 Off-Broadway

Burnout Paradise is a theatrical and performance art work by Australian theatre collective Pony Cam.

== Overview ==
Burnout Paradise is a 65 to 75 minute interactive show in which four Pony Cam performers run on treadmills while attempting to complete a list of tasks. Each treadmill is labelled to represent four different areas of modern life: Leisure, Performance, Admin, and Survival. Tasks include cooking a three-course meal, writing and submitting an arts grant application, and performing a soliloquy from Hamlet. If all tasks are not completed by the end of the show, and/or the performers do not beat their previous personal best record for total miles run, the audience is entitled to a full ticket refund. Burnout Paradise concludes with a live recreation of OK Go's viral music video "Here It Goes Again".

== Personnel ==
Original Pony Cam members:

- Claire Bird - Performer
- Ava Campbell - Performer
- William Strom - Performer
- Dominic Weintraub - Performer
- Hugo Williams - Performer

2026 Astor Place Theatre Understudies/Swings:

- Carl Bryant (Note: Bryant is a former Blue Man, and previously performed in the very same theatre.)
- Chan Lin (Note: Lin is a member of fellow experimental theatre group the Neo-Futurists.)

== Development ==
We’re quite deliberately saying: “We do too much in too many different areas of our lives, and most of us are working to capacity.” And why is that? And how do you get out of that? Is it a psychological phenomenon? Is it a social phenomenon? Is it an economic phenomenon? What are the forces at play here? Is it an individual’s problem? Or is it is it a collective problem? Is it about care for each other, in a really simple way? And what sort of care are we talking about?

— Pony Cam member Hugo Williams

Burnout Paradise was developed in three weeks in a "space that was once an e-scooter repair shop." Pony Cam state they do not have the budget to pay themselves for rehearsal periods: "When we premiered the show, we'd only made fifty percent of it. By doing it in front of an audience, we completed it."

Pony Cam initially formulated the show's to-do list by listing mundane tasks in their day-to-day lives; as the show traveled, the list has been adapted for different audiences and venues.

== Themes ==
Burnout Paradise has been described as a metaphor for the pressures of capitalism, with the treadmills representing "the literal scramble expected from artists who entertain audiences these days," or an "analogy for the chaotic juggle of artistic life." Helen Shaw of The New Yorker points out the show's built-in need for collective action, as task completion is essentially not possible without audience aid; for example, Pony Cam performers may ask volunteers to help shave them, paint their nails, wash their hair, or pick up out-of-reach items that they have dropped while on their treadmills. Similarly, Raven Snook of Time Out New York described the show as "an amusing indictment of our soul-crushing go-go-go ethos and a gleeful conjuring of community."

The show incorporates elements of contemporary clowning and improvisational theatre.

== Productions ==
2023: Melbourne Fringe Festival

2025: St. Ann's Warehouse, La Jolla Playhouse, Edinburgh Festival Fringe

2026: Astor Place Theatre

== Awards and nominations ==
=== 2026 Astor Place Theatre Production ===
Year	Award	Category	Result
2026	Drama Desk Awards	Unique Theatrical Experience	Won

== See also ==
- Endurance art
