= Buried (performance art) =

Performance art by Abel Azcona

- Artist: Abel Azcona
- Year: 2015
- Medium: Performance art
- Location: Pamplona

Buried is a conceptual and performative work of critical, social and political content by artist Abel Azcona. The performance artwork was created in 2015 through a public and participatory performance, or happening, on the esplanade of Franco's Monument to the Fallen in Pamplona. Azcona invited dozens of relatives of Republicans who were shot, persecuted or disappeared during the Spanish Civil War. Descendants of victims make up the installation in a row in front of the monument, all symbolically buried with soil from the garden of one of the participants, where his relatives had been shot. In 2016 the city of Pamplona invited Azcona to show his work inside the Monument and the project was recreated inside the Monument, which had been converted into an exhibition hall, under the name of Unearthed: A retrospective view on the political and subversive work of the artist Abel Azcona. The exhibition brought together the Buried project and fragments of all of Azcona's works.

There are symbols that cannot be covered. The Monument to the Fallen of Pamplona is a clear example. Fighting this symbol with another is what Navarrese artist Abel Azcona has proposed, known for his performance, sometimes controversial and often linked to the body. In this case, Azcona does not propose this new art exhibition as a war between symbols, but as an invitation to arouse feelings and, also, as a claim. For him, it is about inciting memory, individual and collective (and, therefore, historical).

— Association for the Recovery of Historical Memory

In 2016, Azcona coordinated a new performative action, or happening, with relatives of those who were shot in the Pozos de Caudé. Under the name of Desafectos, Azcona formed a wall with the relatives as a complaint, next to the wells outside the city of Teruel, where more than a thousand people had been shot and thrown into the wells over the course of three days during the Civil War.

== Bibliography ==
- Salanova, Marisol (2014). Buried (in Spanish). Micromegas. ISBN 978-8494054549.
- Cano Martínez, Maria Jesús (2018). Escondido tras la piel: representaciones y afrontamientos del dolor y el sufrimiento desde el arte de acción (in Spanish). Universidad de Granada. ISBN 9788491639541.
- Molina Ruiz, Irene (2016). El autorretrato como canalizador del dolor (in Spanish). University of Granada. ISBN 9788491258148.

== See also ==
- Performance art
- Installation
- Endurance art
