= The Nine Confinements or The Deprivation of Liberty =

Performance art by Abel Azcona

- Artist: Abel Azcona
- Year: 2012–2016
- Medium: Performance art
- Location: Bogotá, Lyon, Madrid, Houston

The Nine Confinements, also known as The Deprivation of Liberty, is a conceptual, endurance art and performative work of critical and biographical content by artist Abel Azcona. The artwork was a sequence of performances carried out between 2013 and 2016. All of the series had a theme of deprivation of liberty. The first in the series was performed by Azcona in 2013 and named Confinement in Search of Identity. The artist was to remain for sixty days in a space built inside an art gallery of Madrid, with scarce food resources and in total darkness. The performance was stopped after forty-two days for health reasons and the artist hospitalised. Azcona created these works as a reflection and also a discursive interruption of his own mental illness, being one of the recurring themes in Azcona's work.

Another of the confinements lasted nine days in the Lyon Biennale. Azcona remained inside a garbage container strategically located in the center of the Biennial as a criticism of the artist's own gestation and the market of contemporary art itself. One of the last projects of the series was Black Hole. Performed in 2015, Azcona again remained locked in a small space without light and poor food in the same central art gallery in Madrid. On this occasion different unknown guests shared the confinement with the artist. Azcona was unaware of the guests' origins and could not see them. Visitors of the art gallery were told of the experience by those entering and leaving the confinement with to the artist. All projects were curated and documented from the point of view of the deprivation of liberty including deprivation of food, water, electricity or contact with the outside.

== Bibliography ==
- Group FIDEX, Figures of excess and body policies (2018). Technical-conceptual atlas of the Fidex research group: Micropolitics in contemporary research in Fine Arts (in Spanish). Universitas Miguel Hernández. ISBN 978-8416024711.
- Silva Gómez, Norma Ángelica (2018). Abel Azcona: Of empathy as (im) possibility (in Spanish). Colegio de Saberes de México.
- López Landabaso, Patricia (2017). La performance como medio de expresión artística. Expresiones actuales en el País Vasco (PDF) (in Spanish). Universidad del País Vasco.
- Cano Martínez, Maria Jesús (2018). Escondido tras la piel: representaciones y afrontamientos del dolor y el sufrimiento desde el arte de acción (in Spanish). Universidad de Granada. ISBN 9788491639541.
- Molina Ruiz, Irene (2016). El autorretrato como canalizador del dolor (in Spanish). University of Granada. ISBN 9788491258148.

== See also ==
- Installation art
- Endurance art
