= Eating (performance art) =

Performance art by Abel Azcona

- Artist: Abel Azcona
- Year: 2012
- Medium: Performance Art
- Location: Berlin University of the Arts, Berlin, Copenhagen

Eating is a conceptual and performative work of critical, polemical and political content by artist Abel Azcona also known as Eating a Koran (Spanish: La Ingesta del Corán), Eating a Torah (Spanish: La Ingesta de la Torá) and Eating a Bible (Spanish: La Ingesta de la Biblia).

== History ==
Eating a Koran, Eating a Torah and Eating a Bible were first presented in October 2012 in the exhibition space of The College of Performing Arts, part of the University of the Arts in Berlin. Azcona inaugurated a series of works of a performative nature with the critical content of religious entities. In the works, Azcona used representative icons of various religions, such as the Koran, the Bible, the Torah and other objects of a sacred character. In the most controversial of them, Azcona performs for nine-hour during which he ingests the pages of a copy of the Koran, the Torah and the Bible. This work provoked the most repercussions of any of the series, and the artist was threatened and persecuted for the piece.

The work was performed again in the Krudttønden, Copenhagen. From there, Azcona founded an art collection together with other artists such as Lars Vilks and Bjørn Nørgaard, who had been persecuted and threatened for their creations. With the collective, including Vilks, Nørgaard, the writer Salman Rushdie and the cartoonist Charb (who was killed in the attack on Charlie Hebdo), Azcona carried out performances and conferences for freedom of speech in the Krudttønden between 2013 and 2015. In 2015 the Krudttønden building was attacked by terrorists during a conference. Subsequently, the work Eating a Koran, was bought by a Danish collector and donated to the Krudttønden for the permanent exhibition.

== Bibliography ==
- Group FIDEX, Figures of excess and body policies (2018). Technical-conceptual atlas of the Fidex research group: Micropolitics in contemporary research in Fine Arts (in Spanish). Universitas Miguel Hernández. ISBN 978-8416024711.
- Silva Gómez, Norma Ángelica (2018). Abel Azcona: Of empathy as (im) possibility (in Spanish). Colegio de Saberes de México.
- López Landabaso, Patricia (2017). La performance como medio de expresión artística. Expresiones actuales en el País Vasco (PDF) (in Spanish). Universidad del País Vasco.
- Cano Martínez, Maria Jesús (2018). Escondido tras la piel: representaciones y afrontamientos del dolor y el sufrimiento desde el arte de acción (in Spanish). Universidad de Granada. ISBN 9788491639541.
- Molina Ruiz, Irene (2016). El autorretrato como canalizador del dolor (in Spanish). University of Granada. ISBN 9788491258148.

== See also ==
- Performance art
- Installation
- Endurance art
- 2015 Copenhagen shootings
