= Sheila Klein =

Sheila Klein is a sculptor and public artist living and working in Bow, Washington and Buenos Aires, Argentina. Her practice straddles the worlds of architecture, sculpture, installation and traditional women's crafts. She is particularly noted for her monumental projects dressing public buildings with hand crocheted and knitted steel. She lives on a farm in the Skagit Valley near Seattle, Washington with her artist husband Ries Niemi, and sons Rebar and Torque. Sheila has created numerous public art projects across the USA (e.g. Vermonica), and maintains a parallel studio practice as a sculptor and installation artist.

In 2013 Klein received a GAP award from the Artist Trust to assist with travel and living for a project in Ahmedabad, India, creating an architectural textile together with Muslim women who are members of the Sarkhej Roza Mosque community. National Institute of Design students will also work with Klein to design products which community women can produce to generate a more stable source of income for the community.

== Awards ==
- 2013 Artist Trust | Fellowship Grant | Seattle, Washington
- 2013 McColl Center for Visual Art | Residency | Charlotte, North Carolina
- 2012 Artist Trust | Fellowship Grant | Seattle, Washington
- 2009 Year in Review | Columnseum | Public Art Network
- 2008 Grand Prize for Design | Underground Girl | Metal Architecture.
- 2005 Public Art in Review | Comfort Zone | Art in America.
- 2004 Public Art in Review | Leopard Sky | Art in America.
- 2002 Public Art in Review | Show and Hide | Art in America.
- 2001 Award of Merit Lumen West Awards | Illuminating Engineering Society | Los Angeles Section.
- 2001 Best Subway Station | New Times, Los Angeles | Carefree Guide to L.A. March 8–14.
- 2001 Beautification Award | Highland MetroRail Station, Los Angeles Business Council | Los Angeles, California.
- 2000 Public Art in Review | Underground Girl | Art in America.
- 2000 Best Installation Outside of New York at an Alternative Institution | Nomination, International Art Critics Association.
- 1999 The Westside Prize | Westside Urban Forum, ”Pico Boulevard Streetscape Plan” | Santa Monica, California.
- 1993 Ojai Arts Commission | Ojai, California.
- 1992 Meritorious Achievement Award | Vermonica | City of Los Angeles | Los Angeles, California.
- 1989 Barnsdall Art Park | Board of Overseers | Los Angeles, California.
- 1986 40 Under 40 | Interiors Magazine, September Issue.

== Works and publications ==
Klein, Sheila; Tesner, Linda Brady (2002). Objects between subjects : Sheila Klein. Portland, Ore.: Gallery of Contemporary Art, Lewis & Clark College.
