= Five Day Locker Piece =

1971 performance by Chris Burden

- Artist: Chris Burden
- Year: 1971
- Medium: Performance, documentary photographs

Five Day Locker Piece was a 1971 performance by Chris Burden in which he stayed in a student locker for five days as part of his UC Irvine Master's thesis.

== Description ==
For his UC Irvine Master of Fine Arts thesis, performance artist Chris Burden entered an art building student locker (2 ft × 2 ft × 3 ft) for five days, from April 26–30, 1971. He had some room to wiggle but not unbend. In the lockers above and below him, Burden put a five-gallon water container and an empty container for urine with hoses for each. He fasted for several days in advance and consulted with doctors, who warned of potential blood clots and paralysis.

Outside the locker, students and teachers argued about the project's merits. The campus police considered ending the performance early for Burden's safety. Towards the end, Burden said, the dean's office heard about the performance and considered ending it in light of their responsibility but ultimately decided to let it finish. Near the end, Burden himself began to fear his vulnerability and what someone could do to him.

== Analysis and legacy ==
The performance began Burden's career as a "durational daredevil" and led to polarized opinions about his masochistic oeuvre. It established several themes that would recur in his work: risk of death, endurance, and the audience's moral dilemma. New York Magazine compared the performance to Eusebius of Vercelli's ordeal of confinement.

The work had a confessional quality, as people came to see the performance and would speak in confidence when they could not see the artist.

== Bibliography ==
- Fallon, Michael (2014). "Shoot (1971) – Chris Burden". Creating the Future: Art and Los Angeles in the 1970s. Counterpoint. pp. 98–106. ISBN 978-1-61902-404-5.
- Knight, Cher Krause; Senie, Harriet F. (2018). "Shoot and a Bad Boy Reputation". Museums and Public Art?. Cambridge Scholars Publishing. pp. 89–. ISBN 978-1-5275-1200-9.
- Seiberling, Dorothy (May 24, 1976). "The Art-Martyr". New York. pp. 48–.
