= Pony Cam =

Australian theatre collective

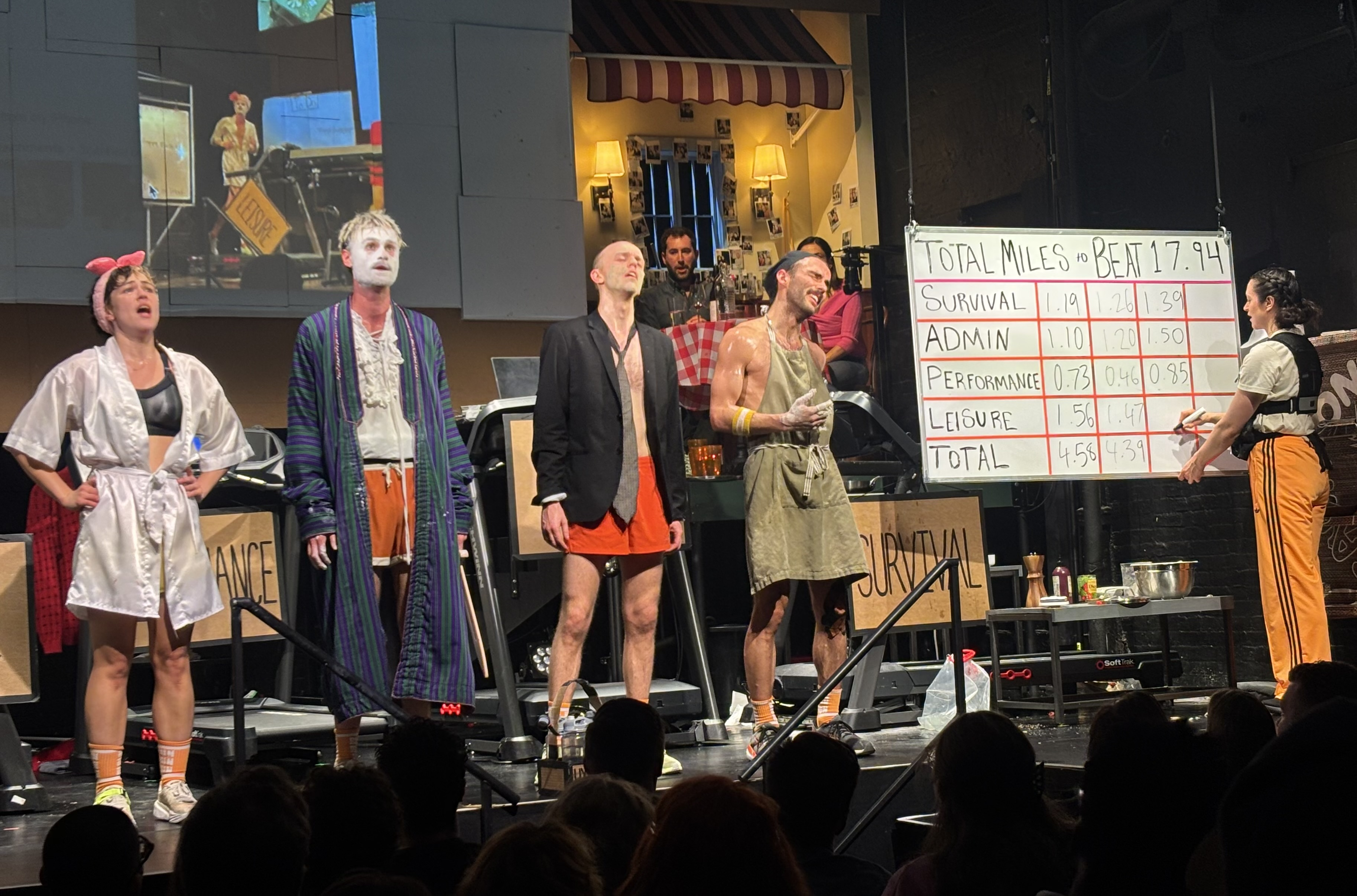
- Pony Cam performing in 2026; from left to right, Claire Bird, Hugo Williams, William Strom, Dominic Weintraub, and Ava Campbell
- Type: Theatre group
- Location: Melbourne
- Website: ponycam.co

Pony Cam are an Australian theatre collective based in Melbourne. They are known for their postdramatic, experimental stage productions across Australia and North America.

== History ==
Pony Cam grew out of a collaboration of five friends who met at Victorian College of the Arts. Their lineup consists of original members Claire Bird, Ava Campbell, William Strom, Dominic Weintraub, and Hugo Williams. Pony Cam emphasize a non-hierarchal structure and creation process: "We’re a collective, which in-and-of-itself is a binding idea, because it means you resist the pull of hierarchy. So instead of having a director, or a writer, or even a leader, we co-author everything."

In 2024, Pony Cam premiered their theatrical production Burnout Paradise—a show in which four Pony Cam members complete tasks on treadmills within an allotted time frame—at the Melbourne Fringe Festival. After touring the show across Ireland and North America, including a stop in Brooklyn at St. Ann's Warehouse, they settled down Off-Broadway in the Astor Place Theatre for a three-month run in 2026, following Blue Man Group’s 30-year-long residency at the venue.

== Themes ==
Pony Cam productions center around themes of capitalism, community, intergenerationality, feminism, sexuality, and the realities of working in the performing arts. Their productions tend to feature elements of audience participation, improvisation, contemporary clowning, postdramatic theatre, and devised theatre, and frequently take place in non-traditional spaces, such as car parks or libraries.

== Theatrical productions ==
Year	Show	Location	Notes
2020	A Red Square	N/A	Virtual-only performance during COVID-19 pandemic.
2021	Paradise Lots	Northland Shopping Centre, Melbourne	
2021	Drive By Paradise	La Mama Theatre, Melbourne	
2022	Anything You Can Do	Darebin Fuse Festival, Darebin	
2022	Paradise Lots	The Drum Theatre, Dandenong	
2022	Grand Theft Theatre	Melbourne Fringe Festival, Melbourne	
2022	Paradise Lots	Melbourne Fringe Festival, Melbourne	
2022	Get It While It's Hot	Abbotsford Convent, Abbotsford	
2023	Anything You Can Do	Chalice Hall, Darebin	
2023	This is Not Going to Go Well	State Library Of Victoria, Melbourne	
2023	And Then There Was Night	The Drum Theatre, Dandenong	Performed in several streets, shops, and restaurants across Dandenong.
2023	Snake Eats Head	N/A	Audio-only performance.
2023	Grand Theft Theatre	St Ambrose Hall, Brunswick	
2023	Boobs in Space	La Mama Theatre, Melbourne	
2023	All of This Could Be Yours	Darebin Fuse Festival, Darebin	
2023	Burnout Paradise	Melbourne Fringe Festival, Melbourne	
2024	Paradise Lots	Platform Arts, Geelong	
2024	Grand Theft Theatre	Adelaide Festival, Adelaide	
2024	Feast	Melbourne Fringe Festival, Melbourne	
2024	Burnout Paradise	St. Ann's Warehouse, New York	
2025	Anything You Can Do	Australian tour	
2025	The Orchard	Malthouse Theatre, Melbourne	
2025	Burnout Paradise	Irish & North American tour	
2026	Burnout Paradise	Astor Place Theatre, New York	
2026	kinda like that	Fall for Dance Festival, New York City Center, New York	
