= Shoot (Burden) =

1971 performance by Chris Burden

- Film still
- Artist: Chris Burden
- Year: 1971
- Medium: Performance, video

Shoot was a 1971 performance by Chris Burden, in which he arranged to have himself non-lethally shot.

== Description ==
On November 19, 1971, at the F-Space gallery in Santa Ana, California, Bruce Dunlap (a friend of Chris Burden, the artist) raised a .22-caliber rifle at a distance of 15 feet (4.57 m) from Burden and shot him in the left arm. The performance was documented in an eight-second video on 16mm film and photographs. There was a small audience for the performance, including the videographer and photographer. The work was later presented through documentary photographs and text from Burden.

== Analysis ==
Burden said that the performance came from the common folklore and televisual motif of getting shot in the United States, whether real or faked, without knowing how it actually felt. The performance was then to feel what he only experienced visually. Additionally, themes from the Vietnam War were frequent on American television news during the time of the performance.

Burden displayed a high degree of control in the work's presentation. In the artist's self-published documentation of the work, the relics of the performance and its text are terse and leave the reader to infer the performance's narrative. Burden himself referred to the photographs as symbols.

Commentators have also noted the role of non-intervention on the part of the performance's attendees, in that in a manifestation of the bystander effect, no one contested the potentially deadly action.

== Legacy ==
Shoot has been described as Burden's "most infamous" work. With Shoot and his later work, Burden pioneered the use of deadly risk as artistic expression. It made him known as "the artist who shot himself", although this description is not technically accurate. As a critic in X-TRA put it, Shoot's primary medium is rumor.

Artist Laurie Anderson's 1976 song, "It's Not the Bullet that Kills You (It's the Hole)", is in reference to Burden's performance.

The performance spawned multiple reproductions. In 1999, an Israeli artist painted Burden after Shoot based on an image in Lucy Lippard's 1973 Six Years: The Dematerialization of the Art Object. Tom LaDuke's 2004 Self-Inflicted Burden is a three-foot (91.4 cm) self-portrait sculpture modeled after Burden after Shoot. UCLA art student Joe Deutch simulated Russian roulette with what appeared to be a loaded weapon in a 2004 performance class. Burden spurred an ensuing media controversy comparatively larger than Shoot's by resigning his teaching post at the university, blaming the university's inaction against a hostile work environment, and likening the work to domestic terrorism. Burden later said that the offshoot work was meant to co-opt, demean, and parody his own. Burden's retirement in reaction to Deutch's performance assured that the work would be remembered in connection with Shoot.

== Bibliography ==
- Bedford, Christopher (2011). "The Viral Ontology of Performance". In Jones, Amelia; Heathfield, Adrian (eds.). Perform, Repeat, Record Live Art in History. Routledge. pp. 77–88. ISBN 978-0-415-59469-1. OCLC 641536228.
- Paulsen, Kris (2017). "Touching Television: Chris Burden's Anti-Spectacular Video and the Ethics of Observation". Here/There: Telepresence, Touch, and Art at the Interface. MIT Press. pp. 67–94. ISBN 978-0-262-03572-9.
