= Metropolis II (sculpture) =

2011 kinetic sculpture by Chris Burden

Coordinates: 34.06320°N 118.35990°W

- Artist: Chris Burden
- Year: 2011
- Type: Kinetic sculpture
- Location: Los Angeles County Museum of Art; Los Angeles, California, United States
- Website: www.lacma.org/art/exhibition/metropolis-ii

Metropolis II (2011) is a kinetic sculpture by Chris Burden at the Los Angeles County Museum of Art.

== Description ==
Measuring almost 10 ft × 20 ft (3.0 m × 6.1 m), 12 ft (3.7 m) high, Metropolis II depicts an imaginary city traversed by gravity-powered, custom-cast cars—1,080 miniature vehicles—as well as HO scale electric trains. Materials include building blocks, Lego blocks, and Lincoln Logs.

The cars travel along 18 Teflon-coated tracks, including a six-lane freeway, at scale speeds ranging from bumper-to-bumper to 240 miles per hour. When the cars reach the bottom, they are connected by magnets to three conveyor belts and raised back to the top of the sculpture. Running at capacity, the sculpture can launch about 100,000 cars an hour. An operator stationed in the midst of the sculpture looks for accidents and can push an emergency stop button.

Burden viewed the contrast between its noisy operation and quiet downtime as mirroring the cyclical nature of life in a bustling city. The artist provided a viewing balcony that allows visitors to view the operating sculpture from a quieter distance.

Metropolis II (2011) at LACMA: March 2013 video

Burden described the piece as a "complicated roller-coaster system" and said that the goal was not to create a literal scale model of a city but to evoke a city's energy. The work, he said, anticipates the era of driverless cars that Burden believed would put an end to traffic gridlock. Burden was unspecific about which city the sculpture depicts: "It could be Dubai or India or China. I think ultimately it’s any city."

A smaller predecessor, Metropolis I (2004), is in Japan at the 21st Century Museum of Contemporary Art, Kanazawa. Measuring 7 ft × 16 ft × 11 ft (2.1 m × 4.9 m × 3.4 m), that sculpture employs about 80 Hot-Wheels cars, which tend to fall off the track. Metropolis II cars are custom built and use magnets for traction. Burden's name is on the tire sidewalls.

== Construction, installation ==
The sculpture was built by a team of eight people who began work in 2006 in Burden's Topanga Canyon studio, unveiling it there in 2011. It was reinstalled at the Los Angeles County Museum of Art's Broad Contemporary Art Museum in 2012 in a specially designed gallery with a viewing balcony. Billionaire Nicolas Berggruen purchased the work and loaned it to the museum through 2022.
