= The Death of The Artist =

Artwork by Abel Azcona

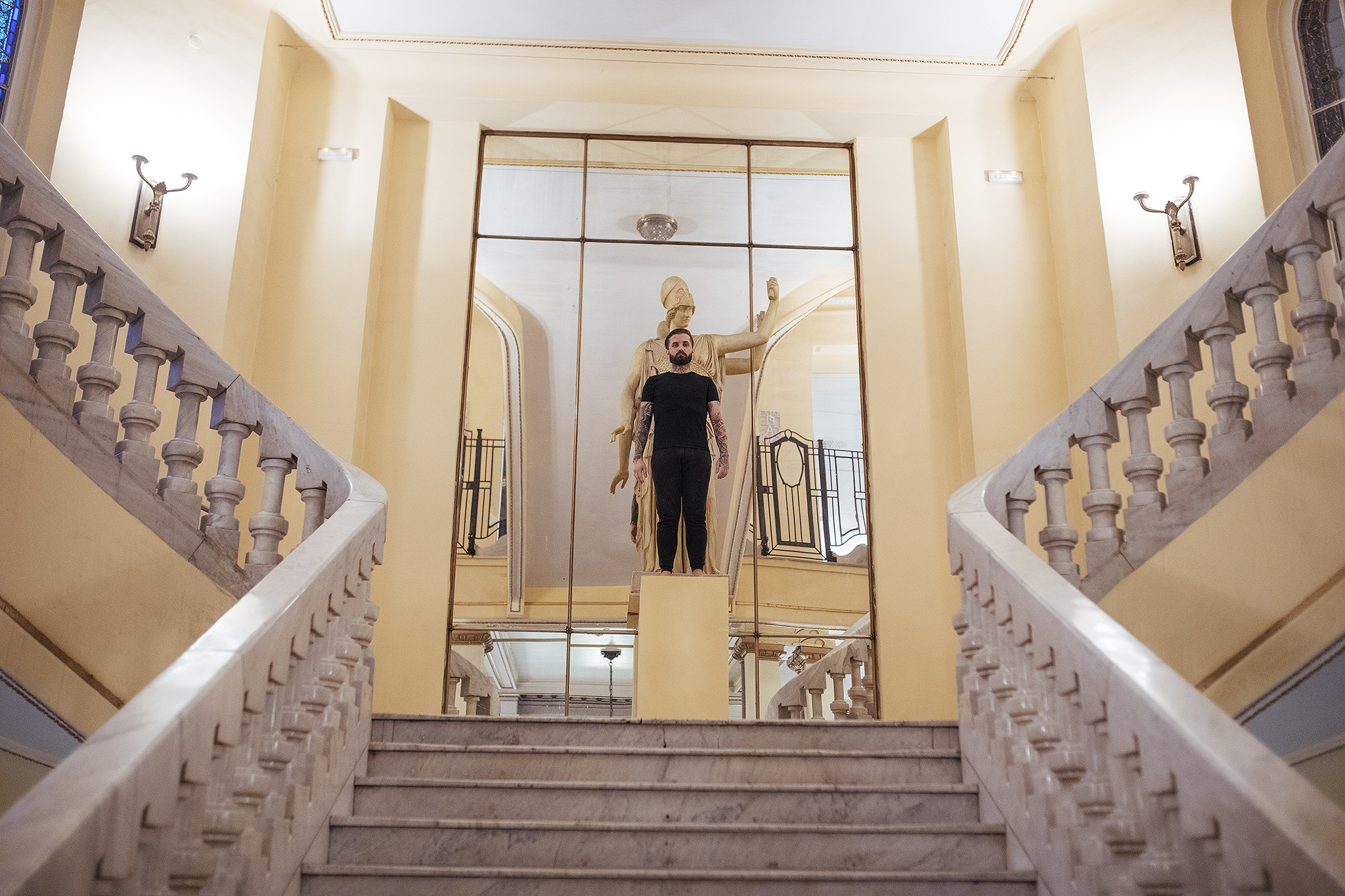
- Artist: Abel Azcona
- Year: 2018
- Medium: Performance art
- Location: Circulo de Bellas Artes, Madrid, Spain

The Death of The Artist is a conceptual and performative work of critical content by artist Abel Azcona. The artwork was both a continuation of his earlier works and closure of the series, being performed in 2018 in the lobby of the Circulo de Bellas Artes in Madrid. His previous works had caused Azcona to receive threats, persecution, and acts of violence. By letter, the artist invited the organizations, groups, and entities that had threatened his life to the installation, where a loaded firearm was offered and Azcona stood exposed on a raised platform.

== Bibliography ==
- Salanova, Marisol (2014). Buried (in Spanish). Micromegas. ISBN 978-8494054549.
- Group FIDEX, Figures of excess and body policies (2018). Technical-conceptual atlas of the Fidex research group: Micropolitics in contemporary research in Fine Arts (in Spanish). Universitas Miguel Hernández. ISBN 978-8416024711.
- Silva Gómez, Norma Ángelica (2018). Abel Azcona: Of empathy as (im) possibility (in Spanish). Colegio de Saberes de México.
- López Landabaso, Patricia (2017). La performance como medio de expresión artística. Expresiones actuales en el País Vasco (PDF) (in Spanish). Universidad del País Vasco.
- Cano Martínez, Maria Jesús (2018). Escondido tras la piel: representaciones y afrontamientos del dolor y el sufrimiento desde el arte de acción (in Spanish). Universidad de Granada. ISBN 9788491639541.
- Molina Ruiz, Irene (2016). El autorretrato como canalizador del dolor (in Spanish). University of Granada. ISBN 9788491258148.
