= Chris Burden =

American contemporary artist (1946–2015)

- Burden in 2013
- Born: Christopher Lee Burden; April 11, 1946; Boston, Massachusetts, U.S.
- Died: May 10, 2015 (aged 69); Topanga Canyon, California, U.S.
- Education: Pomona College (BA); University of California, Irvine (MFA)
- Known for: Performance art, installation art, sculpture
- Spouses: Barbara Burden (m. 1967; div. 1976): Nancy Rubins

Christopher Lee Burden (April 11, 1946 – May 10, 2015) was an American contemporary artist working in performance art, sculpture, and installation art. Burden became known in the 1970s for his performance art works, including Shoot (1971), where he arranged for a friend to shoot him in the arm with a small-caliber rifle. A prolific artist, Burden created many well-known installations, public artworks, and sculptures before his death in 2015.

== Early life and career ==
Chris Burden was born in Boston, Massachusetts in 1946 to Robert Burden, an engineer, and Rhoda Burden, a biologist. He grew up in Cambridge, Massachusetts, France and Italy.

At the age of 12, Burden had emergency surgery, performed without anesthesia, on his left foot after he was severely injured in a motor-scooter crash on the island of Elba. During the long convalescence that followed, he became deeply interested in visual art, particularly photography.

He studied for his B.A. in visual arts, physics and architecture at Pomona College in 1965–1969 and received his MFA at the University of California, Irvine—where his teachers included Robert Irwin—from 1969 to 1971.

== Work ==
=== Early performance art ===
Chris Burden began to work in performance art in the early 1970s. He made a series of controversial performances to directly confront the violent realities of the Vietnam War and American culture. By pushing himself to physical extremes—enduring pain, confinement, and danger—he forced audiences to viscerally experience the raw, brutal truth of events they otherwise observed with detachment. His first significant performance work, Five Day Locker Piece (1971), was created for his master's thesis at the University of California, Irvine, where he locked himself in a school locker for five days.

Other performances from the 1970s included Deadman (1972), in which Burden lay on the ground covered with a canvas sheet and a set of road flares until bystanders assumed he was dead and called emergency services (leading to his arrest); Match Piece (1972) (also known as Match), in which Burden launched lit matches at a naked woman lying between him and a set of two televisions in a room covered with butcher paper.

Dos Equis, October 16, 1972. Laguna Beach, California.

Dos Equis (1977), Burden installed two upright Xs, each constructed from 16-foot beams, which blocked both lanes of Laguna Canyon Road. The timbers had been soaked in gasoline for several days prior to the event. Burden ignited the structures, leaving them burning. B.C. Mexico (1973), in which he kayaked to a desolate beach in Baja Mexico where he lived for 11 days with no food and only water; Fire Roll (1973), in which he set a pair of pants on fire and then rolled on them to extinguish them; Prelude to 220, or 110, in which he had himself bolted to a concrete floor by copper bands, next to two buckets of water that also contained live 110-volt wires. As visitors to the gallery were trusted not to spill any of the water, Burden would’ve been electrocuted and died. In Honest Labor (1979), Burden was invited to lecture about his work at Emily Carr College of Art and Simon Fraser University and decided to show the students by example, and dug a large ditch. Velvet Water (1974), in which Burden spent five minutes attempting to breathe water. As he explained to the live audience watching; "Today I'm going to breath [sic] water, which is the exact opposite of drowning because when you breath [sic] water you believe the water to be a thicker richer oxygen capable of sustaining life". Do You Believe in Television (1976), in which he sent an audience to the third floor of a building — where television monitors showed them the ground floor — and then lit a fire on the ground floor (sources differ as to whether the monitors showed the fire, forcing the audience to realize that the screens represented reality, or showed an intact ground floor, forcing them to realize that the screens did not represent reality).

Still from TV Hijack, February 9, 1972, Channel 3 Cablevision, Irvine, California

In TV Hijack (1972), Burden brought his own camera crew to cover a televised interview with Phyllis Lutjeans, an art critic and curator who hosted the live TV show. When Burden was asked to discuss any new ideas he was working on, he offered to demonstrate TV Hijack and got up from his chair holding a knife to Lutjeans's neck, threatening to kill her if the station stopped live transmission. When asked about the incident in 2015, Lutjeans stated that Burden was a 'gentle soul', that she knew it was an art piece, and that the incident did not damage their pre-existing friendship. To conclude the piece, Burden demanded that the station hand over the recording of the incident, which he then destroyed.

Perhaps his best-known work from that time is the 1971 performance piece Shoot, in which he was shot in his left arm by an assistant from a distance of about sixteen feet (5 m) with a .22 rifle. As Burden explained his motives behind the piece, “I had an intuitive sense that being shot is as American as apple pie. We see people being shot on TV, we read about it in the newspaper. Everybody has wondered what it’s like. So I did it”.

His 1973 work 747 involved the artist firing several pistol shots directly at a Boeing 747 passenger jet plane while it took off from Los Angeles International Airport. The piece had a single witness, photographer Terry McDonnell, who filmed the act.

Doorway to Heaven, Venice, California, November 15, 1973.

Doorway to Heaven (1973). Burden stood in the doorway of his Venice studio as a few spectators watched him push two live electrical wires together into his chest. As the wires met, they exploded, burning the artist and shorting out, preventing him from being electrocuted.

One of Burden's most reproduced and cited pieces, Trans-Fixed took place on April 23, 1974, at Speedway Avenue in Venice, California. For this performance, Burden lay face up on a Volkswagen Beetle and had nails hammered into both of his hands, as if he were being crucified on the car. The car was pushed out of the garage and the engine revved for two minutes before being pushed back into the garage.

Later that year, Burden performed his piece White Light/White Heat at the Ronald Feldman Gallery in New York City. For this work of experiment performance and self-inflicting danger, Burden spent twenty-two days lying on a triangular platform in the corner of the gallery. He was out of sight from all viewers and he could not see them either. According to Burden, he did not eat, talk, or come down the entire time.

Several of Burden's other performance pieces were considered controversial at the time: another "danger piece" was Doomed (1975), in which Burden lay motionless in a gallery at the Museum of Contemporary Art, Chicago under a 5 ft × 8 ft (1.5 m × 2.4 m) slanted sheet of glass near a running wall clock. Burden planned to remain in that position until a museum employee prioritized his well-being over the artistic integrity of the piece. After 40 hours, the museum staff consulted physicians. 5 hours and 10 minutes after that, museum employee Dennis O'Shea placed a pitcher of water within Burden's reach, at which point Burden rose, smashed the glass, and took a hammer to the clock, thus ending the piece.

=== Engineered works ===
The B-Car, Saugus, California, Road Test, June 30, 1976

By the end of the 1970s, Burden had turned to vast engineered sculptural installations. In 1975, he created the fully operational B-Car, a lightweight four-wheeled vehicle that he described as being "able to travel 100 miles per hour and achieve 100 miles per gallon" (160 km/h and 43 km/L). Some of his other works from that period are DIECIMILA (1977), a facsimile of an Italian 10,000 Lira note, possibly the first fine art print that (like paper money) is printed on both sides of the paper; The Speed of Light Machine (1983), in which he reconstructed a scientific experiment with which to "see" the speed of light; and the installation C.B.T.V. (1977), a reconstruction of the first ever made Mechanical television.

In 1979, Burden first exhibited his notable Big Wheel exhibition at Rosamund Felsen Gallery. It was later exhibited in 2009 at the Museum of Contemporary Art, Los Angeles.

In 1980, he produced The Atomic Alphabet – a giant, poster-sized hand-colored lithograph – and performed the text dressed in leather and punctuating each letter with an angry stomp. Twenty editions of the work were produced and are largely in the possession of museums, including SFMOMA and the Whitney Museum of American Art.

1988's Samson was a 100-ton hydraulic jack which was connected to a turnstile such that, with each guest who entered the Newport Harbor Art Museum, timbers were rammed into the museum's supporting walls, meaning that "if enough people entered the museum, it would collapse". The exhibit was forcibly disassembled by the local fire department after a complaint that it was blocking a fire exit. In 2008, Burden reported having subsequently sold Samson to "a collector in Brazil".

=== Architectural works ===
Tale of Two Cities at New Museum, 2013, photo by Benoit Pailley.

In a further elaboration on Burden’s works concerning engineering, he focuses on the relationship between what is built and how it shapes who we are culturally through the stories it tells and the power behind it, saying about this work, “The origin of power both physical and bureaucratic, and how this power ultimately shapes the world in which we exist.” These sculptures are intricate installations and structures consisting of many small parts. A Tale of Two Cities (1981) was inspired by the artist's fascination with war toys, bullets, model buildings, antique soldiers, and a fantasy about the twenty-fifth century – a time when he imagines the world will have returned to a system of feudal states. The room-filling miniature reconstruction of two such city-states, poised for war, incorporates 5,000 war toys from the United States, Japan, and Europe – on a 1,100-square-foot (100 m^{2}), 20-short-ton (18 t) sand base surrounded by a "jungle" made of houseplants.

All the Submarines of the United States of America, 625 cardboard submarine models,1987.

The gallery-sized installation All the Submarines of the United States of America (1987) consists of 625 identical, small, handmade, painted-cardboard models that represent the entire United States submarine fleet dating from the late 1890s, when submarines entered the navy's arsenal, to the late 1980s. He suspended the cardboard models on monofilaments from the ceiling, placing them at various heights so that as a group they appear to be a school of fish swimming through the ocean of the gallery space. In 1989 and 1992, Burden created a massive, 14-foot (4.3 m) diameter, five-ton suspended sculpture from concrete and rock, Medusa's Head, which appeared as a barren, rocky planet hanging from a chain inches from the floor with a detailed miniature train system weaving through its rugged, industrial landscape. The work suggests how humanity's drive for progress—represented by industrial infrastructure and engines—eventually leads to environmental ruin and materialized entropy.

The Fist of Light, 1993. Aluminum, HVAC equipment, halide lights.

Questioning society’s relationship with energy and emphasizing its capacity to harness and weaponize the universe's most destructive forces, Burden presented The Fist of Light at the 1993 Whitney Biennial exhibition in New York. The work comprised a sealed, kitchen-sized metal box containing hundreds of metal halide lamps burning at such intensity that an industrial air conditioner was necessary to cool the room.

Hell Gate (1998), is a 28-foot-long (8.5 m) scale model, in Erector and Meccano pieces and wood, of the dramatic steel-and-concrete railroad bridge that crosses the Hell Gate segment of the East River, between Queens and Wards Island. In 1999, Burden's sculpture When Robots Rule: The Two Minute Airplane Factory was shown at the Tate Gallery in London. It was a "factory-like assembly line which manufactures rubber-band-powered model aeroplanes from tissue paper, plastic and balsa wood". Each plane had a propeller powered by a rubber band, and when each was completed, at a rate of one every 2 minutes, the machine launched it to fly up and circle around the gallery. Unfortunately, the machine was non-functional for at least two months of the installation, leading World Sculpture News to question the intent of the piece and remark that "the work illustrated that robots, in fact, don't rule everything, and for the time being, are still subjected to individual and groups shortcomings".

First presented at the Istanbul Biennial in 2001, Nomadic Folly (2001) consists of a large wooden deck made of Turkish cypress and four huge umbrellas. Visitors can relax and linger in this tent-like structure, replete with opulent handmade carpets, braided ropes, hanging glass and metal lamps, and wedding fabrics embroidered with sparkling threads and traditional patterns.

In 2005, Burden released Ghost Ship, his crewless, self-navigating yacht which docked at Newcastle-upon-Tyne on 28 July after a 330-mile (530 km) 5-day trip from Fair Isle, near Shetland. The project was commissioned by the company Locus+ at a cost of £150,000, and was funded with a significant grant from Arts Council England, being designed and constructed with the help of the Marine Engineering Department of the University of Southampton. It is said to be controlled via onboard computers and a GPS system; however, in case of emergency the ship is 'shadowed' by an accompanying support boat.

What My Dad Gave Me, 2008, in front of Rockefeller Center.

Burden had constructed a 65-foot-tall skyscraper using small stainless-steel Erector Set pieces and installed it in front of Rockefeller Center in the summer of 2008. Titled What My Dad Gave Me, the sculpture, despite being composed of toy parts, matched the scale of a six-story building and weighed over seven tons. Its assembly required approximately one million components. Burden intended to acknowledge his father, an engineer, for inspiring his early interest in engineering. As Burden stated, creating a life-size building from an Erector Set had always been an aspiration.

In 2008, Burden created Urban Light, a sculptural work consisting of 202 found antique street lights that had once stood around Los Angeles. He bought the lights from the contractor who installed Urban Light, Anna Justice. The work is on view outside of the Los Angeles County Museum of Art, and the solar-powered lights are illuminated at dusk.

Metropolis II (2011) kinetic art project by Chris Burden. At LACMA, filmed March 16, 2013

In the summer of 2011, Burden finished his kinetic sculpture, Metropolis II, which took four years to build. It was installed at LACMA in Fall 2011. "Chris Burden's Metropolis II is an intense kinetic sculpture, modeled after a fast-paced, frenetic modern city."

Porsche With Meteorite (2013) features a bright yellow, restored 1974 Porsche sports car and a meteorite balanced at opposite ends of a rust-patinated steel beam. The car is positioned on the side of the beam closer to the vertical support, while the meteorite occupies the opposite end. This juxtaposition of refined human engineering and raw extraterrestrial material underscores the invisible forces that govern the physical world.

Light of Reason was commissioned by Brandeis University in 2014 and stands outside the Rose Art Museum on campus. The sculpture consists of three rows of 24 Victorian lamp posts which point away from the museum's entrance. The sculpture serves as a gateway and outdoor event space, and has become a campus landmark.

Burden's last completed project – a working dirigible that flies in perfect circles called Ode to Santos Dumont after the pioneering Brazilian aviator – was unveiled at a private Gagosian Gallery event outside of Los Angeles shortly before his death and later installed as a tribute at LACMA. Also, the New Museum decided to have Twin Quasi-Legal Skyscrapers (2013), two 36-foot-tall towers created for the museum's retrospective on Burden, remain on the institution's roof for several months in tribute. At the time of his death, Burden was also working on a watermill next to Frank Gehry's not then yet completed aluminum tower at LUMA Arles, which was finished in 2021. Burden's work remained unfinished at the time of his passing as well.

== Exhibitions ==
In 2013, the New Museum presented "Chris Burden: Extreme Measures", an expansive presentation of Burden's work that marked the first New York survey of the artist and his first major exhibition in the United States in over twenty-five years. Burden has also had major retrospectives at the Newport Harbor Art Museum, Newport Beach, California (1988), and the Museum of Applied Arts, Vienna (1996). Other solo exhibitions include "14 Magnolia Doubles" at the South London Gallery, London (2006); "Chris Burden" at the Baltic Center of Contemporary Art, Gateshead (2002); and "Tower of Power" at the Museum Moderner Kunst Stiftung Ludwig, Vienna (2002). In 1999 Burden exhibited at the 48th Venice Biennale and the Tate Gallery in London. In the summer of 2008, Burden's 65-foot-tall (20 m) skyscraper made of one million erector set parts, titled What My Dad Gave Me, stood in front of Rockefeller Center, New York City.

== Awards and honors ==
- 1974, 1976, 1980, and 1983, National Endowment for the Arts (NEA) Fellowships
- 1978, Guggenheim Fellowship for Fine Arts.
- 1991, Chevalier des Arts et des Lettres
- 1997, Skowhegan Medal for Sculpture, awarded by Skowhegan School of Painting and Sculpture.
- 2009, Distinguished Artist Award for Lifetime Achievement, awarded by the College Art Association.
- 2014, Elected to the American Academy of Arts and Sciences

== Collections ==
Burden's work is featured in prominent museum collections such as the LACMA and the Museum of Contemporary Art, Los Angeles; the Whitney Museum of American Art and the Museum of Modern Art, New York; the Tate Gallery, London; the Middelheimmuseum, Antwerp, Belgium; the Inhotim Centro de Arte Contemporanea, Brazil; the 21st Century Museum of Contemporary Art, Kanazawa, Japan; and the Museum of Contemporary Art, Chicago, among others.

== Art market ==
Burden was represented by Gagosian Gallery from 1991 until his death. In 2009, a deal that Gagosian Gallery had struck to buy $3 million in gold bricks for Burden's work One Ton, One Kilo was frozen when it turned out that the bricks had been acquired from a Houston-based company owned by financier Allen Stanford, who was later charged by the U.S. Securities and Exchange Commission and sentenced to 110 years in prison for cheating investors out of more than $7 billion over 20 years in one of the largest Ponzi schemes in American history. As of 2013, the gallery's gold has been frozen while the SEC investigates Stanford and One Ton One Kilo cannot be mounted until the gold bullion is released.

== Teaching ==
In 1978, Burden started teaching at University of California, Los Angeles (UCLA), and became a tenured professor, head of New Genres at the UCLA Department of Art in 1986 a position from which he resigned in 2005 due to a controversy over the university's alleged mishandling of a student's classroom performance piece that echoed one of Burden's own performance pieces. Burden cited the performance in his letter of resignation, saying that the student should have been suspended during the investigation into whether school safety rules had been violated. The performance allegedly involved a loaded gun, but authorities were unable to substantiate this.

== In popular culture ==
David Bowie's 1977 song "Joe the Lion" was inspired by Burden's 1974 Trans-Fixed, where Burden crucified himself on the roof of a Volkswagen Beetle. Laurie Anderson titled her 1977 song "It's Not the Bullet that Kills You – It's the Hole (for Chris Burden)". Tracks "Prelude to 110 or 220/Women of the World", "Movie on the way down" and "Through the night softly" on Jim O'Rourke's album Eureka are named after Burden's works. Burden was also mentioned in the Jeff Lindsay book Dexter by Design, and in Norman Mailer's book The Faith of Graffiti. The poem "Doomed (1975)" by David Hernandez in his 2011 collection Hoodwinked describes the Burden installation of the same name in Chicago. In poet Jason Schneiderman's 2020 collection Hold Me Tight there is a sequence about Burden.

== Personal life ==
Burden was married to multi-media artist Nancy Rubins. He lived and worked in Los Angeles, California. His studio was located in Topanga Canyon. From 1967 to 1976, Burden was married to Barbara Burden, who documented and participated in several of his early artworks.

Burden died on May 10, 2015, 18 months after having been diagnosed with melanoma. He was 69.
