= List of U.S. states by per capita arts funding =

State arts funding per capita in the United States refers to the amount of public money allocated by U.S. States governments to their state arts agencies, divided by the population of the state. The measure is commonly used to compare public investment in arts and culture across states and is typically reported annually by the National Assembly of State Arts Agencies (NASAA). It reflects legislative appropriations intended to support cultural programs, grants to arts organizations, arts education initiatives, and other cultural activities administered at the state level.

== Overview ==
State arts agencies are government entities responsible for distributing public funding to support arts and cultural activities within each state. These agencies typically provide grants to nonprofit arts organizations, artists, schools, museums, and community programs. They also help administer federal funding from the National Endowment for the Arts (NEA) and coordinate statewide cultural initiatives. In addition to state arts agencies, the NEA partners directly with the six US Regional Arts Organizations, all 501(c)(3) nonprofits: Arts Midwest, Creative West, Mid-America Arts Alliance, Mid Atlantic Arts, New England Foundation for the Arts, and South Arts. All state and territorial arts agencies are members of a distinct regional arts organization.

Per capita spending is widely used by policymakers, researchers, and arts advocates to evaluate the relative level of state commitment to cultural funding. Nationally, combined public funding for the arts—federal, state, and local—amounted to about $1.8 billion in fiscal year 2024, representing an average public investment of about $5.44 per capita across all levels of government. For fiscal year 2026, the level of state funding for the arts, including line items, fell to about $649.2 million for fiscal year 2026, a 7.4% decrease from 2025.

== History and evolution ==
State-level arts funding emerged primarily during the 1960s alongside the creation of the National Endowment for the Arts (NEA) in 1965. At the time, only five U.S. states had arts agencies: Maine, New York, North Carolina, Utah, and Wisconsin. Their combined budgets totaled less than $3 million. Federal policy encouraged states to create agencies capable of distributing federal arts grants locally, leading to the rapid establishment of state arts councils across the country.

Throughout the late twentieth century, state arts funding expanded in nominal terms. However, economic downturns frequently caused significant cuts. State arts appropriations peaked around 2001 before declining during the early-2000s recession and again during the Great Recession of 2008–2009. When adjusted for inflation, public arts funding in the United States decreased substantially in the two decades following 2000. Despite fluctuations, state arts agencies remain a central component of the U.S. public arts funding system. For instance, federal, state, and local governments together invested approximately $1.31 billion in arts funding in 2021, though this figure represents a modest level of public investment compared with many other developed nations.

Several states consistently rank near the top of the nation in per capita arts funding. Minnesota has frequently held the top position due largely to the Legacy Amendment, a 2008 voter-approved tax initiative that dedicates funding to arts and cultural heritage programs. Delaware and Maryland also rank among the highest in legislative support, with per capita appropriations exceeding $5 in some fiscal years.

Other states regularly appear near the bottom of national rankings. Georgia, New Hampshire, and Wisconsin have been among the lowest in per capita arts spending in recent years, with funding levels measured in cents rather than dollars per resident. Wisconsin's arts spending, for example, fell sharply after a 68% reduction in the Wisconsin Arts Board budget in 2011, folding the agency under the state's Department of Tourism and leaving it near the bottom of national rankings with approximately $0.20 per capita in arts funding by 2026. One of the most dramatic instances of reduction recorded for a state arts agency was California's cuts to its arts council funding by roughly 94% during a budget crisis in 2003.

== Most current ranking ==
The following table is a ranking of the 50 U.S. states by legislative appropriations for state arts agencies per resident for fiscal year 2027.^{α}

Rank	State	Per capita appropriations for FY2027 (USD)	Appropriations for FY2027 (USD)	Appropriations for FY2026 (USD)	Change
19	Alabama	1.37	7,108,983	7,057,537	+0.73%
21	Alaska	1.24	916,600	902,600	+1.55%
45	Arizona	0.26	2,000,000	2,000,000	0.00%
44	Arkansas	0.37	1,154,144	1,314,130	−12.17%
26	California	0.92	36,137,000	31,804,000	+13.62%
36	Colorado	0.56	3,365,976	3,484,081	−3.39%
41	Connecticut	0.41	1,497,298	1,497,298	0.00%
2	Delaware	6.09	6,452,200	6,434,700	+0.27%
28	Florida	0.85	20,000,000	21,210,797	−5.71%
49	Georgia	0.14	1,587,150	1,837,400	−13.62%
7	Hawaii	3.04	4,350,605	9,985,755	−56.43%
40	Idaho	0.46	926,100	931,600	−0.59%
15	Illinois	1.68	21,409,000	21,338,000	+0.33%
39	Indiana	0.47	3,278,256	3,278,256	0.00%
42	Iowa	0.40	1,280,000	1,450,000	−11.72%
46	Kansas	0.25	750,000	1,000,000	−25.00%
43	Kentucky	0.39	1,776,000	1,804,500	−1.58%
37	Louisiana	0.54	2,480,617	2,080,617	+19.23%
27	Maine	0.87	1,232,124	1,137,355	+8.33%
3	Maryland	5.17	32,361,749	30,709,051	+5.38%
5	Massachusetts	3.77	26,975,152	26,975,152	0.00%
46	Michigan	0.25	2,500,000	2,450,000	+2.04%
1	Minnesota	9.38	54,680,000	45,484,000	+20.22%
9	Mississippi	2.24	6,615,312	6,606,176	+0.14%
23	Missouri	1.15	7,214,680	10,118,952	−28.70%
22	Montana	1.22	1,400,161	1,385,603	+1.05%
20	Nebraska	1.34	2,699,586	2,668,359	+1.17%
32	Nevada	0.79	2,594,688	2,824,179	−8.13%
50	New Hampshire	0.12	165,000	150,000	+10.00%
6	New Jersey	3.39	32,355,000	32,355,000	0.00%
28	New Mexico	0.85	1,805,400	1,694,900	+6.52%
4	New York	4.06	81,135,000	81,191,485	−0.07%
24	North Carolina	1.04	11,606,933	11,606,933	0.00%
16	North Dakota	1.67	1,331,267	1,331,267	0.00%
8	Ohio	2.25	26,781,201	26,710,595	+0.26%
25	Oklahoma	0.95	3,902,325	3,902,325	0.00%
35	Oregon	0.57	2,431,047	2,431,047	0.00%
30	Pennsylvania	0.82	10,698,000	10,776,000	−0.72%
12	Rhode Island	1.98	2,210,565	2,016,128	+9.64%
13	South Carolina	1.90	10,603,268	10,603,268	0.00%
18	South Dakota	1.56	1,461,412	1,431,204	+2.11%
10	Tennessee	2.12	15,486,300	13,358,000	+15.93%
33	Texas	0.58	18,288,573	18,288,573	0.00%
11	Utah	2.07	7,318,300	8,968,500	−18.40%
17	Vermont	1.66	1,071,800	1,096,800	−2.28%
38	Virginia	0.52	4,590,172	4,590,172	0.00%
31	Washington	0.80	6,394,000	6,530,000	−2.08%
33	West Virginia	0.58	1,028,838	381,424	+169.74%
48	Wisconsin	0.20	1,184,238	1,184,238	0.00%
14	Wyoming	1.85	1,091,045	1,077,774	+1.23%

== See also ==
- National Endowment for the Arts
- Cultural policy of the United States

== Notes ==
^α These are legislative appropriations excluding line items. Also known as a baseline appropriation, a legislative appropriation excluding line items does not include line items passing through the state arts agency (SAA). Since line items are designated for specific entities, the state legislature, not the SAA, controls the funding amount and recipient. This baseline figure better represents the appropriated funds SAAs have available to use for programs and operations.
