= Petrella Ann Bonner =

American singer-songwriter

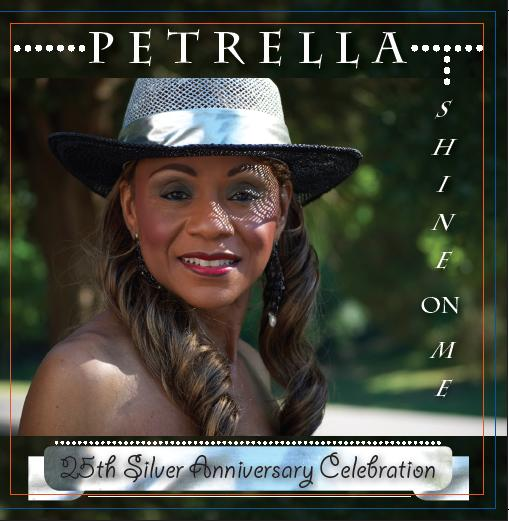

Petrella Ann Bonner (born April, 1947) is an American country music singer, songwriter, and music producer. Billing herself as "The first lady of country soul", she has released eight studio albums. A number of her songs have appeared on the Top 100 Country Singles charts, and she has toured throughout the United States. She was named “Songwriter of the Year” in 1994 by the Tennessee Songwriters Association.

== Early life and education ==
Bonner was born in Hot Springs, Garland County, Arkansas. She first started singing in her grandmother's and aunt's Baptist Church and began her formal training under John Puckett at Goldstein Elementary School where she performed a Pearl Bailey tribute. While attending Langston High School she was a member of the school choir. She continued her education at Lincoln University in Jefferson City, MO before transferring to Philander Smith College in Little Rock, AR where she was a member of the Philander Smith Collegiate Choir under the direction of Carl Harris, Jr.

== Career ==
=== Early career ===
As a young woman, Bonner worked primarily in accounting or as an administrative assistant for various companies including Chrysler Defense where she worked on the XM1 (Marshall) Tank Program for the U.S. Army and Ford Aerospace where she received a top secret clearance to work on the Hubble I Program.

=== Music career ===
In 1988 as a member of the Los Angeles Songwriters Showcase, Petrella received her first record contract from pitching a demo to Jack Gale of Playback Records, an independent record label in Nashville, TN. She signed a contract in 1989 with Ridgewood Records (a division of Playback Records) for a 2-sided single. In 1991 the song "This Isn't Goodbye" charted on the Up and Coming Chart at Number 14. and "Blues Stay Away From Me", charted on Cashbox Top 100 Country Singles at number 85. This chart action led Gale to form a “Country-Soul Division" under Playback Records with the first album release featuring Petrella distributed nationally by Laurie Records. A video of “Blues Stay Away from Me” recorded in California was also released and played nationally. On March 13, 1993 the music trade magazine Cashbox featured her on the cover and the cover story. Her single "I Found Somebody" placed her as the #1 Indie at #53 on Cashbox Top 100 Country Singles.

In 1994, two other singles, "Go For It" and "Remedy" reached the country charts top 100 and Nashville Tracker magazine nominated Petrella as New Female Vocalist of the Year and her Album was nominated as “Album of the Year”. Petrella's relationship with Gale spanned almost 30 years until his death in 2018 and included three CDs (Petrella, 100 Proof Woman and Shine on Me). That year she went to Nashville, TN to prepared her one-woman show for her first tour. She performed at the 1994 Inaugural Country Fanfest at the LA County Fairgrounds in Pomona, CA as well as touring seven secondary markets including on-air interviews at radio stations in Hot Springs, AR, Hot Springs Village, AR, Childress, TX, Pampa, TX, Clovis, NM, Portales, NM and Alamogordo, NM.

As a member of the Nashville Songwriters Association International, Petrella received “Songwriter of the Year” from the Tennessee Songwriters Association for her song “Living on a Shoestring”. Petrella also joined R.O.P.E. (Reunion of Professional Entertainers, Nashville, TN) in 1994. Petrella also has showcased at Nashville's The Broken Spoke and attended songwriter nights at The Bluedbird Café and Douglas Corner. She performed at Norman Petty Studio in Clovis, NM in 1995 and appeared on the Midnight Jamboree Radio show out of the Ernest Tubbs Record Store where she performed “Blues Stay Away from Me” while being backed by the Rhonda Vincent Band.

The start of 2000 took Petrella to Pasadena, CA where she reconnected with David Scheffler, a producer who had worked on a lot of her songwriting demos. She worked with Scheffler on her CD Papa Did a Raindance as well as working with Jason Miles (New York producer) on two songs for the CD, Anthony Smith (Nashville) on three songs for the CD and Charles Ng for a photo shoot for the CD art work.

In the years 2000 through 2007 Petrella was touring and promoting her CDs throughout the United States with stops at Hastings video and music stores in 16 cities in AR, TX, NM, OK, CO, TN and WY. She also started performing at coffee shops with her “Brewing a cup of Dreams” tour throughout IA, WI and IL.

In 2008 she signed a distribution deal with Warner Bros. Records through TMG, resulted in her single "I Want To Know You Forever" from her 2008 CD 100 Proof Woman charting on the Billboard Hot Single Sales at number 15.

Petrella moved to Pasadena, CA in 2010 to write songs for a new album and to attend the California College of Music where she received a Certificate of Completion of the Artist Development Program, Professional Level on March 25, 2011. At CCM she received instruction from Kevin Dorsey, Phillip Ingram, Oren Waters, Uros Raskovski, Alex Brown, Dr. Sherri Canon, Ray Iglese and Daniel Brummel.

In the year 2012 she recorded her 25th anniversary album Shine on Me with DJ Jack Gale as her producer and filmed a video of her single “Working in the USA” with video producer K.C. Amos.

In 2012 Petrella formed a band, Mixed Influence, and for the next few years played at venues throughout Southern California and Central Coast California. She opened for The Spinners in February 2018 at The Rose Music Venue in Pasadena, CA. She has also opened for Gladys Knight, Tracy Lawrence, A. J. Croce (son of Jim Croce), Billy Vera and the Beaters and the Delfonics.

Petrella has released eight studio albums (consisting of six country albums, one gospel album and one Christmas album) and a two-song CD for the Lupus Foundation of America, Arkansas Chapter. (See Discography) Her Nashville studio albums included working with studio musicians Buddy Emmons (Slide Guitar on Countryversial and 100 Proof Woman), Rob Hajacos (Fiddle player on 100 Proof Woman and Shine on Me) and Eddie Bayers (Drummer on Shine on Me).

In 2016 Petrella was listed in Essence magazine as one of the “18 Black Country Singers You Need to Know”.

2021 brought Petrella's 8th album "Song of Many Colors" with lead-off single "Bebop Hoedown" scoring 164,781 streams on Spotify with the follow-up single "Bring It Here Baby" receiving 163,201 streams on Spotify.

Petrella's memorabilia are on display at the Mosaic Templars Museum in Little Rock, AR, have been donated to the Arkansas History Commission, and are on file at the Country Music Hall of Fame in Nashville, TN. Her accomplishments have been documented by the University of Indiana African American Archive of Music and Culture and by the History Makers in Chicago, IL.

=== Theatre ===
Petrella was introduced to the theatre at Tarrant County Junior College and appeared in three amateur productions. Based on this experience, in 2009 Petrella developed a one-woman show called 18 Reasons to Live, Laugh and Love with the help of writer/director Stacy Schronk. She joined the Arkansas Arts Council, the Mid-America Arts Alliance and Arts Midwest, and attended showcases and booking conferences; she then performed her show throughout Kansas, Arkansas, and Nebraska, and in 2012 performed three shows at the Carrie Hamilton Theatre located at the historic Pasadena Playhouse.

Also in 2009, Petrella represented Hot Spring Village in the Mrs. Arkansas American beauty pageant and as a first time contestant was awarded Mrs. Congeniality.

== Philanthropy ==
In 1996, Petrella created Dreams of the Heartland Foundation, a not-for-profit organization that utilized the proceeds from her album sales to the Garland County Literacy Council, the Lupus Foundation of America, Charitable Christian Medical Clinics, Habitat for Humanity, and Court Appointed Special Advocates. Her foundation also provided scholarships to music majors or full-time members of the college choir at Philander Smith College, her alma mater.

In 2013 Petrella formed a band in Arkansas to tour Arkansas and help raise money for “Every Child is Ours” in Northeast Arkansas. The band also performed with and raised money for the Philander Smith College Choir.

In the summer and fall of 2015 Petrella sponsored two scholars to work as interns in the Country Music Hall of Fame and Museum's Digital and Library Collections department, re-housing approximately 20,000 images from the Fabry Collection into archival quality storage. Most recently she donated two acres of land to Habitat for Humanity, on which four homes were built.

== Personal ==
Petrella was married in 1976 to her husband Bob and has two children, Nedra and April and five grandchildren. She had one great grandson, Braiden, who died at the age of 3. Petrella and her family have lived in several states including Michigan, Ohio, Iowa, Colorado, Arizona, Arkansas, Texas, Louisiana, Tennessee, and California. She currently resides in California with her husband.

== Discography ==
=== Studio albums ===
- 1988 “Petrella”, Recorded at Reflection Studio, Nashville Playback Records, Arranger Jim Pierce, Producer Jack Gale, included Buddy Emmons (Steel Guitar) (Re-released as “Countryversial” in 1992 by Garden Mound Records), 3 singles charted on Cashbox Country Music Charts
- 2000 “Papa Did A Raindance”, Garden Mound Records, producers Anthony Smith (Nashville), Jason Miles (New York) and David Scheffler & Petrella (California)
- 2001 2 Songs for Lupus Foundation, “Find a Cure” and “No Cure”
- 2003 “Home for the Holidays”, Garden Mound Records (Proceeds to Habitat for Humanity), Producer David Scheffler
- 2004 “Walk Around Heaven”, Garden Mound Records (Proceeds to Garland County Charitable Christian Medical Clinic), Producer David Scheffler
- 2005 “Dreams of the Heartland, Garden Mound Records, Co-producers, David Scheffler and Petrella
- 2007 “100 Proof Woman”, Garden Mound Records/Playback Records, Recorded in Nashville, Arranger Walter Cunningham, Producer Jack Gale, Included Buddy Emmons on Steel Guitar and Rob Hajacus on Fiddle. 1 single charted on Billboard Hot Single Sales Chart
- 2013 “Shine on Me, 25th Silver Anniversary Celebration, Garden Mound Records/Playback Records, Recorded in Nashville, Arranger Jim Pierce, Producer Jack Gale, included Rob Hajacus on Fiddle and Eddie Bayers on Drums
- 2021 "Songs of Many Colors", Garden Mound Records, Recorded in California, Co-producers, David Scheffler, Petrella and Kevin Dorsey

=== Videos ===
- 1991 “Blues Stay Away from Me” Produced and directed by Studio on the Mountain, Morro Bay, CA
- 2013 “Working in the USA” Produced by Dale Stelly, Directed by K.C. Amos

=== Documentary ===
- 2013 “Petrella: Shine on Me”, Directed by Cheryl Batts, Videographer, Michael Mueller, premier showing Oct 17, 2013 at the 22nd Annual Hot Springs Documentary Film Festival,
