= US Regional Arts Organizations =

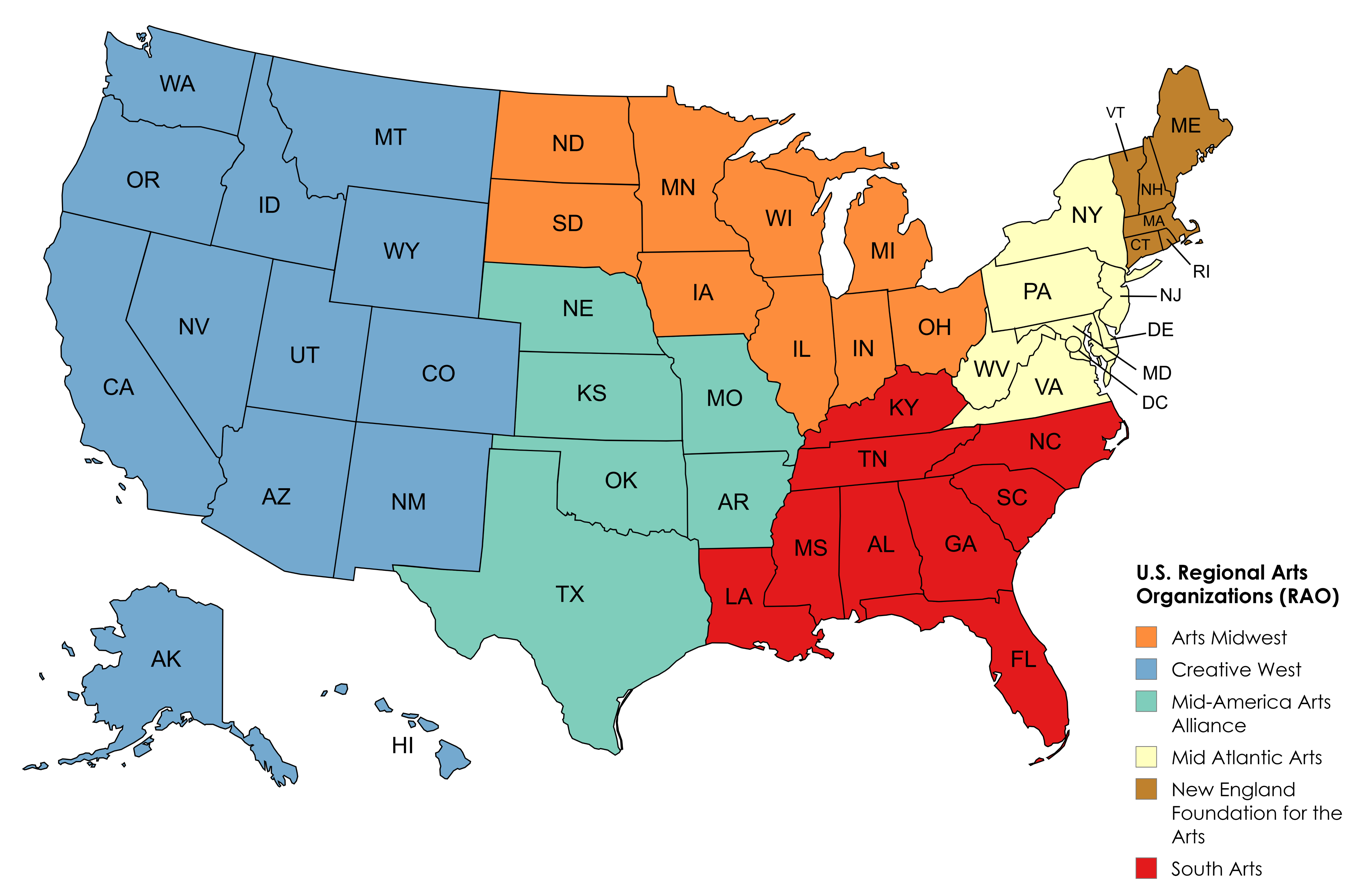
U.S. Regional Arts Organizations (RAO) as of 2026

The US Regional Arts Organizations (US RAO) are six not-for-profit entities created to encourage development of the arts and to support arts programs on a regional basis. Funded by the National Endowment for the Arts, membership dues, and various enterprises, they provide technical assistance to their member state and territory arts agencies, support and promote artists and arts organizations, and develop and manage arts initiatives on local, regional, national and international levels.

As of 2026, the six US RAOs are Arts Midwest, Creative West, Mid-America Arts Alliance, Mid Atlantic Arts, New England Foundation for the Arts, and South Arts.

== List of US Regional Arts Organizations ==
Regional organization	Headquarters	Revenue (year)^{α}	Member states	Member state agencies
Arts Midwest	Minneapolis	$7,384,591 (2025)	Illinois	Illinois Arts Council
Arts Midwest	Minneapolis	$7,384,591 (2025)	Indiana	Indiana Arts Commission
Arts Midwest	Minneapolis	$7,384,591 (2025)	Iowa	Iowa Arts Council
Arts Midwest	Minneapolis	$7,384,591 (2025)	Michigan	Michigan Arts and Culture Council
Arts Midwest	Minneapolis	$7,384,591 (2025)	Minnesota	Minnesota State Arts Board
Arts Midwest	Minneapolis	$7,384,591 (2025)	North Dakota	North Dakota Council on the Arts
Arts Midwest	Minneapolis	$7,384,591 (2025)	Ohio	Ohio Arts Council
Arts Midwest	Minneapolis	$7,384,591 (2025)	South Dakota	South Dakota Arts Council
Arts Midwest	Minneapolis	$7,384,591 (2025)	Wisconsin	Wisconsin Arts Board
Creative West	Denver	$24,616,315 (2025)	Alaska	Alaska State Council on the Arts
Creative West	Denver	$24,616,315 (2025)	American Samoa	American Samoa Council on Arts, Culture and Humanities
Creative West	Denver	$24,616,315 (2025)	Arizona	Arizona Commission on the Arts
Creative West	Denver	$24,616,315 (2025)	California	California Arts Council
Creative West	Denver	$24,616,315 (2025)	Colorado	Colorado Creative Industries
Creative West	Denver	$24,616,315 (2025)	Guam	Guam Council on the Arts and Humanities Agency
Creative West	Denver	$24,616,315 (2025)	Hawaii	Hawai’i State Foundation on Culture and Arts
Creative West	Denver	$24,616,315 (2025)	Idaho	Arts Idaho
Creative West	Denver	$24,616,315 (2025)	Montana	Montana Arts Council
Creative West	Denver	$24,616,315 (2025)	Nevada	Nevada Arts Council
Creative West	Denver	$24,616,315 (2025)	New Mexico	New Mexico Arts
Creative West	Denver	$24,616,315 (2025)	Northern Mariana Islands	Commonwealth Council for Arts and Culture
Creative West	Denver	$24,616,315 (2025)	Oregon	Oregon Arts Commission
Creative West	Denver	$24,616,315 (2025)	Utah	Utah Division of Arts and Museums
Creative West	Denver	$24,616,315 (2025)	Washington	ArtsWA
Creative West	Denver	$24,616,315 (2025)	Wyoming	Wyoming Arts Council
Mid-America Arts Alliance	Kansas City	$6,600,000 (2025)	Arkansas	Arkansas Arts Council
Mid-America Arts Alliance	Kansas City	$6,600,000 (2025)	Kansas	Kansas Arts Commission
Mid-America Arts Alliance	Kansas City	$6,600,000 (2025)	Missouri	Missouri Arts Council
Mid-America Arts Alliance	Kansas City	$6,600,000 (2025)	Nebraska	Nebraska Arts Council
Mid-America Arts Alliance	Kansas City	$6,600,000 (2025)	Oklahoma	Oklahoma Arts Council
Mid-America Arts Alliance	Kansas City	$6,600,000 (2025)	Texas	Texas Commission on the Arts
Mid Atlantic Arts	Baltimore	$7,953,293 (2025)	Delaware	Delaware Division of the Arts
Mid Atlantic Arts	Baltimore	$7,953,293 (2025)	District of Columbia	DC Commission on the Arts and Humanities
Mid Atlantic Arts	Baltimore	$7,953,293 (2025)	Maryland	Maryland State Arts Council
Mid Atlantic Arts	Baltimore	$7,953,293 (2025)	New Jersey	New Jersey State Council on the Arts
Mid Atlantic Arts	Baltimore	$7,953,293 (2025)	New York	New York State Council on the Arts
Mid Atlantic Arts	Baltimore	$7,953,293 (2025)	Pennsylvania	Pennsylvania Creative Industries
Mid Atlantic Arts	Baltimore	$7,953,293 (2025)	Puerto Rico	Instituto de Cultura Puertorriqueña
Mid Atlantic Arts	Baltimore	$7,953,293 (2025)	US Virgin Islands	Virgin Islands Council on the Arts
Mid Atlantic Arts	Baltimore	$7,953,293 (2025)	Virginia	Virginia Commission for the Arts
Mid Atlantic Arts	Baltimore	$7,953,293 (2025)	West Virginia	West Virginia Department of Tourism
New England Foundation for the Arts	Boston	$19,173,253 (2025)	Connecticut	Connecticut Office of the Arts
New England Foundation for the Arts	Boston	$19,173,253 (2025)	Maine	Maine Arts Commission
New England Foundation for the Arts	Boston	$19,173,253 (2025)	Massachusetts	Mass Cultural Council
New England Foundation for the Arts	Boston	$19,173,253 (2025)	New Hampshire	New Hampshire State Council on the Arts
New England Foundation for the Arts	Boston	$19,173,253 (2025)	Rhode Island	Rhode Island State Council on the Arts
New England Foundation for the Arts	Boston	$19,173,253 (2025)	Vermont	Vermont Arts Council
South Arts	Atlanta	$15,446,472 (2025)	Alabama	Alabama State Council on the Arts
South Arts	Atlanta	$15,446,472 (2025)	Georgia	Georgia Council for the Arts
South Arts	Atlanta	$15,446,472 (2025)	Florida	Florida Arts and Culture
South Arts	Atlanta	$15,446,472 (2025)	Kentucky	Kentucky Arts Council
South Arts	Atlanta	$15,446,472 (2025)	Louisiana	Louisiana Division of the Arts
South Arts	Atlanta	$15,446,472 (2025)	Mississippi	Mississippi Arts Commission
South Arts	Atlanta	$15,446,472 (2025)	North Carolina	North Carolina Arts Council
South Arts	Atlanta	$15,446,472 (2025)	South Carolina	South Carolina Arts Commission
South Arts	Atlanta	$15,446,472 (2025)	Tennessee	Tennessee Arts Commission

== Notes ==
1.^αThis includes government grants, foundation contributions, state arts agencies dues, individual contributions, and revenue generated by various investments.

== See also ==
- List of U.S. states by per capita arts funding
