= Carol Brown (arts administrator) =

American businessman

- Born: Columbus, Ohio, U.S.
- Occupation: First president of the Pittsburgh Cultural Trust

Carol Brown was president and CEO of the Pittsburgh Cultural Trust, a $50 million private, nonprofit agency in Pittsburgh, Pennsylvania from 1986 to 2000.

== Background ==
Born in Columbus, Ohio, Brown spent many of her formative years in Mt. Lebanon, Pennsylvania. She earned her B.A. from Marquette University and her M.A. from the University of Chicago. From 1959 to 1967 she was an English professor at Chatham College in Pittsburgh. She was married to Clifford Brown, an economist who helped establish Federated Investors. Following his death, she began her post-academic career.

As head of Allegheny County's Bureau of Cultural Programs, she spearheaded the development of arts programming at Hartwood Acres, and also oversaw the creation and implementation of public art projects for the Port Authority Light Rail Transit System. She then became the head of the county's Department of Parks, Recreation & Conservation. and was in that position when she was approached in 1986 by Jack Heinz, former chief executive officer of the H.J. Heinz Co. to become the first president of The Pittsburgh Cultural Trust, which has been engaged, since the early days of its formation, in promoting the cultural and economic growth of downtown Pittsburgh through the development of a fourteen-block arts and entertainment center in downtown Pittsburgh—the Cultural District. The first major project completed by the Trust was the transformation of the Stanley Theater into the Benedum, with Brown stating the venue's transformation “marked the beginning of a unified community effort on the part of Pittsburgh’s philanthropy and cultural organizations to create a Cultural District in our Downtown.”

Brown's leadership of urban redevelopment in the district was widely praised by many during her tenure, including Brendan Lemon of The New York Times who wrote, “To describe Pittsburgh’s unconventional, un-Disneyfied remodeling of its Cultural District... is to explore how theater can help transform urban identity”.

Brown has also served on the board of directors of Mellon Financial, Heinz Endowments, Duquesne University, Chatham College, Mid Atlantic Arts Foundation, and the National Assembly of State Arts Agencies. In addition, she was a past Chair of the Pennsylvania Council on the Arts, Citizens for the Arts in Pennsylvania, the Pennsylvania Arts Coalition, the Mid Atlantic Arts Foundation, and the National Assembly of State Arts Agencies.

== Honors and awards ==
Brown has received numerous awards throughout her career including Pittsburgh Woman of the Year In the Arts (1982), "Q" Award of WQED for Community Service (1983), Distinguished Daughter of Pennsylvania (1985), Pittsburgh Woman of the Year (1992), Doctor of Humane Letters, Honoris Causa, Seton Hill College (1986); Doctor of Humane Letters, Honoris Causa, Allegheny College (1993); Doctor of Public Service, La Roche College (1996); The Governor's Award For Arts Leadership and Service (1996); Doctor of Humane Letters, Honoris Causa, Chatham College (2000); The Allerton Award of the YWCA (2001); The Caliguiri Award of Vectors (2001); as well as community leadership awards from the Jewish National Fund, the Historical Society of Western Pennsylvania, the Phipps Conservatory, and the Pittsburgh Center for the Arts.

== Retirement ==
Brown retired in December 2000. She was succeeded by J. Kevin McMahon in January 2001.
