= Arts Midwest =

American non-profit arts organization headquartered in Minneapolis

- Formation: 1985
- Purpose: Support, inform, and celebrate Midwestern creativity
- Headquarters: Minneapolis, MN
- Region served: Midwest (Illinois, Indiana, Iowa, Michigan, Minnesota, North Dakota, Ohio, South Dakota, Wisconsin)
- Services: Grants and awards, community programs, storytelling and media
- Key people: Torrie Allen (President & CEO)
- Budget: $7m USD (2022)
- Website: www.artsmidwest.org

Arts Midwest is one of six not-for-profit regional arts organizations created to “encourage development of the arts and to support arts programs on a regional basis.” Arts Midwest's mission is to "build unprecedented opportunity across the Midwest by advancing creativity.” Its vision is that Midwestern creativity powers thriving, entrepreneurial, and welcoming communities. Arts Midwest is primarily funded by the National Endowment for the Arts (NEA), and is charged with supporting artists and arts organizations, and providing assistance to its nine member states of Illinois, Indiana, Iowa, Michigan, Minnesota, North Dakota, Ohio, South Dakota, and Wisconsin.

== History ==
Regional arts programs first emerged in the late 1960s in response to a need for greater access to performing arts touring in areas isolated from major cultural centers. The development of the U.S. Regional Arts Organizations (USRAOs) was encouraged in 1973 by the NEA House reauthorizing committee, which stated its belief that:

Cooperation among states in their activities to support the arts can significantly serve the purposes of this act… It is felt that the regional approach would better serve the cultural needs of the people in many areas by allowing the full utilization of the resources of several states to be brought to bear where special needs exist.

The legislation creating RAOs was introduced by Public Law 93-133. Since 1973, the United States Congress has set aside a specific appropriation within the NEA budget for the states and their regional organizations. The RAOs, which include Arts Midwest, Mid-America Arts Alliance, Mid Atlantic Arts Foundation, the New England Foundation for the Arts, South Arts, and the Western States Arts Federation, use this funding to coordinate the touring and presenting of visual and performing arts programs in the United States.

Arts Midwest was formed in 1985 through the merger of two USRAOs, the Affiliated State Arts Agencies of the Upper Midwest and the Great Lakes Arts Alliance. It is supported by the NEA’s appropriation, as well as private support in the forms of individual gifts, corporate and foundation grants, and dues paid by member State Arts Agencies.

== Programs and Services ==
Arts Midwest focuses its efforts on three areas: supporting, informing, and celebrating Midwestern Creativity.

=== Support ===
Arts Midwest invests time, funds, and resources in organizations that advance creativity. Its work includes grantmaking, community artist residencies, and bringing people together to learn from one another. Current initiatives include:

- Grow, Invest, Gather (GIG) Fund: The GIG Fund provides grants to arts organizations to grow their capacity, fund artist engagements, and build community.
- We the Many: Arts Midwest works with rural communities to co-create performing arts residencies. These residencies help Midwesterners understand and appreciate the power of creativity in their communities. They also invite conversation on how to create welcoming spaces for new voices.
- World Fest: Arts Midwest supports the touring of world music ensembles to communities in the Midwest for weeklong residencies. Residencies include workshops in schools and public concerts.

Arts Midwest manages two national initiatives for the National Endowment for the Arts:

- The National Endowment for the Arts Big Read is a program of the NEA managed by Arts Midwest. It was created in response to Reading at Risk: A Survey of Literary Reading in America, a report issued in July 2004 by the NEA that identified issues facing literary reading. The mission of the Big Read is “to bring together partners across the country to encourage citizens to read for pleasure and enlightenment.”
- Shakespeare in American Communities supports professional productions of William Shakespeare for students in schools and juvenile justice facilities by providing grants to theater companies.

=== Inform ===
Arts Midwest shares resources and information with Midwestern arts administrators and organization. It provides toolkits and training opportunities. Current initiatives include its Ideas Hub, a collection of articles and tools that explore best practices in artistic programming; communications; leadership and culture; diversity, equity, inclusion, and accessibility; fundraising; strategy; and community engagement.

=== Celebrate ===
Arts Midwest also focuses on storytelling about the creative people, places, and organizations that make up the Midwest. Current initiatives include sharing stories and media about Midwestern creativity and offering awards that celebrate Midwestern arts and creative leaders.

== Partners ==
- Illinois Arts Council
- Indiana Arts Commission
- Iowa Arts Council
- Michigan Arts and Culture Council
- Minnesota State Arts Board
- North Dakota Council on the Arts
- Ohio Arts Council
- South Dakota Arts Council
- Wisconsin Arts Board
