= Flag and seal of Virginia =

U.S. state flag and seal

Commonwealth of Virginia
- Use: Civil and state flag
- Proportion: 2:3
- Adopted: March 28, 1912 (standardized February 1, 1950, revised August 1986, June 1997, 2006) (Note: The very first Virginia state flag was adopted in 1861. It featured a similar design to the current flag.)
- Design: The obverse of the state seal upon a white circle in the center of a deep blue field.

Seal of the Commonwealth of Virginia
- Obverse

Versions
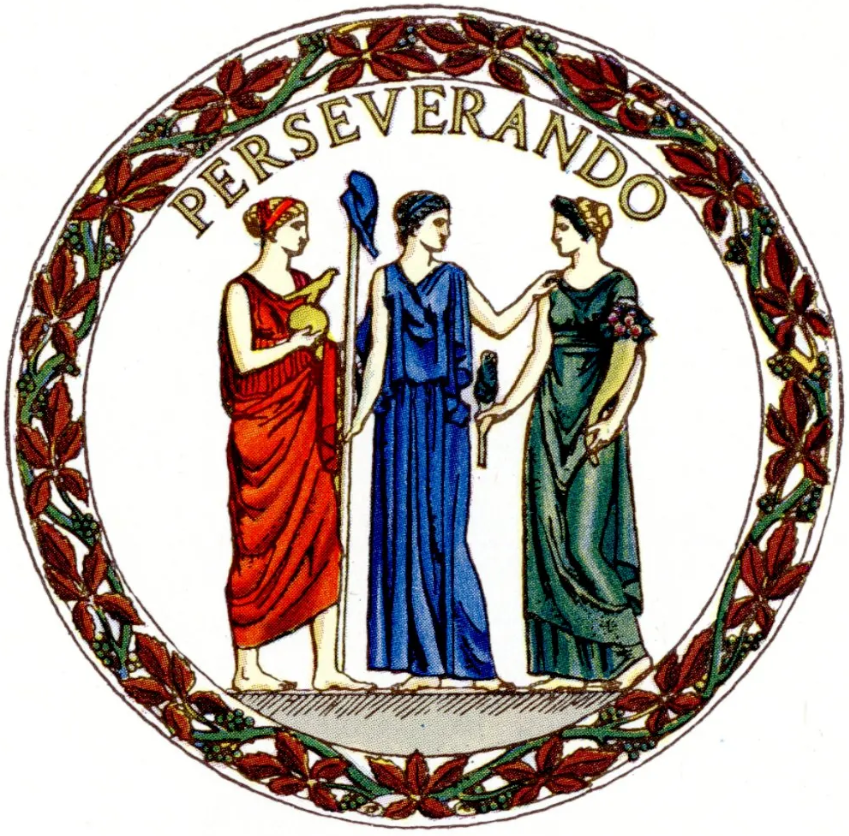
- Reverse
- Armiger: Commonwealth of Virginia
- Adopted: March 28, 1912 (standardized February 1, 1950)
- Motto: Sic Semper Tyrannis
- Designer: Charles Keck

The seal of Virginia is the official symbolic representation of the Commonwealth of Virginia, a U.S. state. The state flag of Virginia consists of the obverse of the seal against a blue background. A state flag was first adopted at the beginning of the American Civil War in April 1861, readopted in 1912, and standardized by the General Assembly in February 1950. The standing allegorical female figure of virtue is shown having vanquished tyranny, symbolized by a fallen king at her feet. She has an exposed breast in the manner of classical depictions of Amazons. The motto shown on the seal, Sic semper tyrannis, means "Thus always to tyrants."

It is one of six U.S. state flags (along with Florida, New York, New Jersey, Wyoming, and Idaho) with a depiction of a woman, and the only state flag in the U.S. depicting nudity.

The flag may be decorated with a white fringe along the fly edge; this is usually done when the flag is displayed indoors.

== Legal description of flag ==
The 2024 Code of Virginia, Title 1, Chapter 5, § 1-506 defines the state flag as follows:

...a deep blue field, with a circular white centre of the same material. Upon this circle shall be painted or embroidered, to show on both sides alike, the coat of arms of the Commonwealth, as described in § 1-500 for the obverse of the great seal of the Commonwealth; and there may be a white fringe on the outer edge, furthest from the flagstaff.

== Flag history ==
The Virginia state flag that was used during the Civil War in the 1860s.

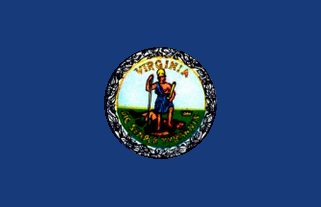
The Virginia flag from the 1930s before standardization of the seal; it depicts Virtus and tyranny on a grassy field.

=== Unofficial flags (1833–1861) ===
The first state flag was made in 1833 during the Nullification Crisis. It was raised on February 22 by Governor John Floyd in Richmond, and later displayed at Bellona Arsenal and other public buildings. Floyd suggested that the flag should fly during special events instead of the U.S. flag. The flag and the idea of flying it in place of the U.S. flag caused great resentment among some members of the Virginia House of Delegates who threatened to tear the flag down. In defense of the flag, other house members proclaimed that they would die for the flag. Floyd would later raise the American flag alongside the state flag to appease both sides of the house.

In June of 1845, the state commissioned a flag for a local Richmond militia. It bore a blue field with the states coat of arms in the middle, while the other side had the coat of arms of the United States.

During the Mexican-American War troops from the state carried flags with the Virginia coat of arms on them. In September of 1846, the state ordered for 2 large state flags to be displayed at the capitol. One them measured 20 x 36 feet and was similar to the American flag but with a white disc in the canton with the states coat of arms in it. The other had the same design but measured 20 x 40.

In 1853, a state flag was made to be displayed in the New York Crystal Palace. On one side was a large star with the coat of arms and motto of the state in the middle. The other side contain 31 stars with a Bald eagle and the words "The Union." The whole thing measured 3 x 4 feet.

In 1860, 2 militia companies from the state ordered some unique American flags. Each flag was constructed in Baltimore and featured the states coat of arms on its field. The design was later used by pro-union militias during the American Civil War.

During President Lincoln's inauguration, delegates from the state carried with them an American flag with the word "Virginia" on it.

=== Official flag (1861–1865) ===
The flag was not officially adopted until April 30, 1861, nearly two weeks after Virginia seceded from the Union, making it the flag of what secessionists regarded as a sovereign Commonwealth during its alignment with the Confederate States of America.

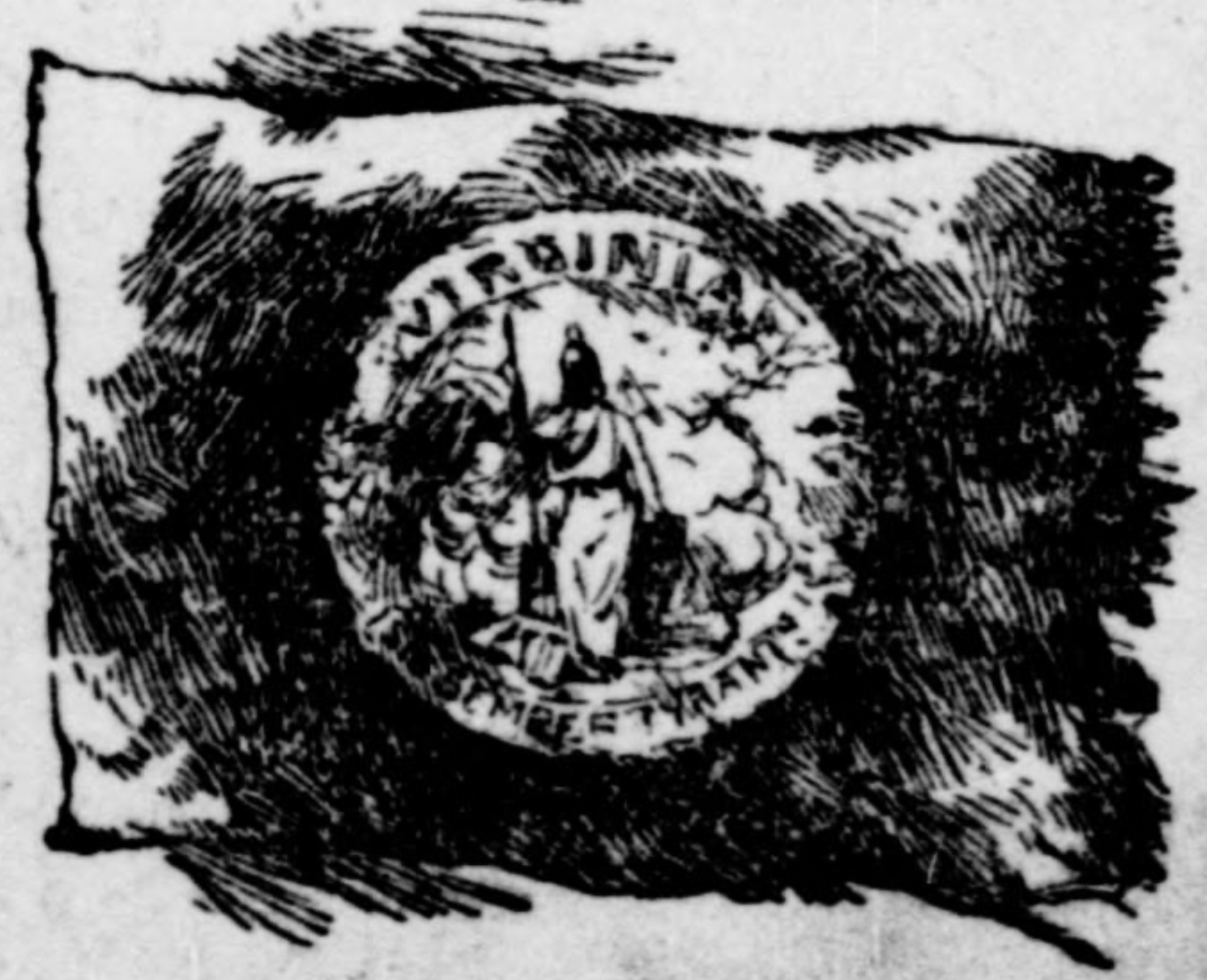
Flag of the 48th Virginia Infantry, c.1861

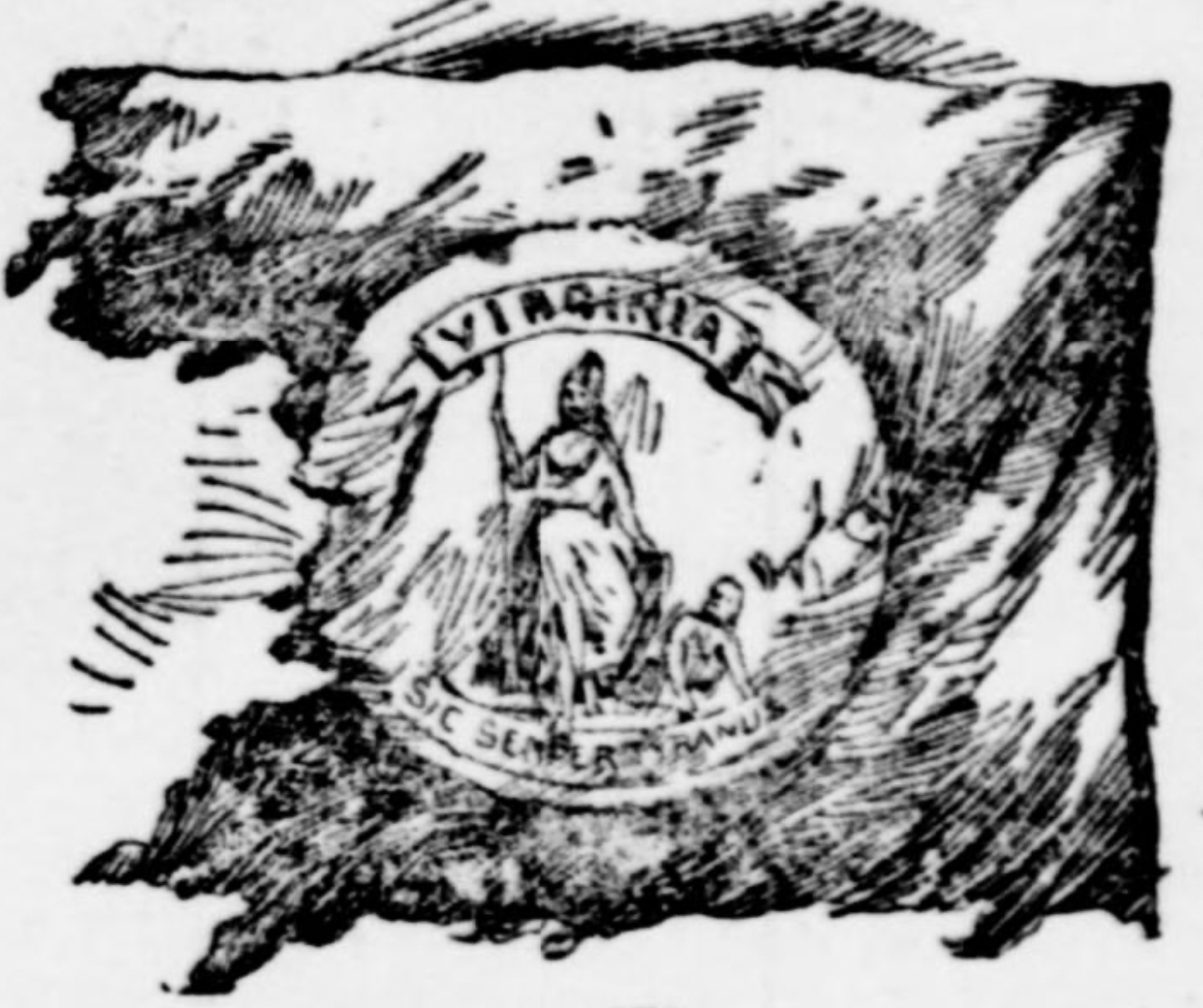
State flag from 1864

=== Unofficial flags (1865-1912) ===
In 1869, during a reception in Richmond for governor-elect Gilbert C. Walker, a large procession honored him with both the national flag and a state flag displayed on his carriage and during his speech.

Sources suggest that the flag gradually faded from official use after the Civil war as, in 1873, a bill was introduced in the House of Delegates to re-establish the state flag as adopted in 1861.

In May of 1890, a large ball was being held at the local threader in the city of Richmond. The central area was decorated with fabric and shields bearing the coat of arms of 11 southern states. While in the back of the threader there were 2 white flags, with one of them containing the coat of arms of Virginia in the center.

In 1893 city of Trenton, New Jersey celebrated the unveiling of the Trenton Battle Monument. In the New Jersey state house hung state flags from the original 13 colonies. The Virginia's flag had a silk white field with the coat of arms embroidered in the middle. The flag was constructed by a group of women from the state for the event.

During the 1907 Jamestown Exposition the Governor's flag was flown over the Virginia building. The design of the banner was never described.

In 1909 the American Consul-General in Shanghai, China requested Adjutant-General Anderson for a state flag, to be use by the Shanghai Volunteer Corps. It was later sent to them and was described as being of the regulation size and color, with the Virginia coat of arms in the center.

=== Official flag (1912-present) ===
The current flag of Virginia was adopted on March 28, 1912. The current flag was designed to be similar to the Civil War state flag. When the state seal was standardized on February 1, 1950, the flag was also updated to reflect the standardization.

In 2001, the North American Vexillological Association surveyed its members on the designs of 72 U.S. state, U.S. territorial, Canadian provincial and Canadian territorial flags. The survey ranked the Virginia flag 54th out of 72.

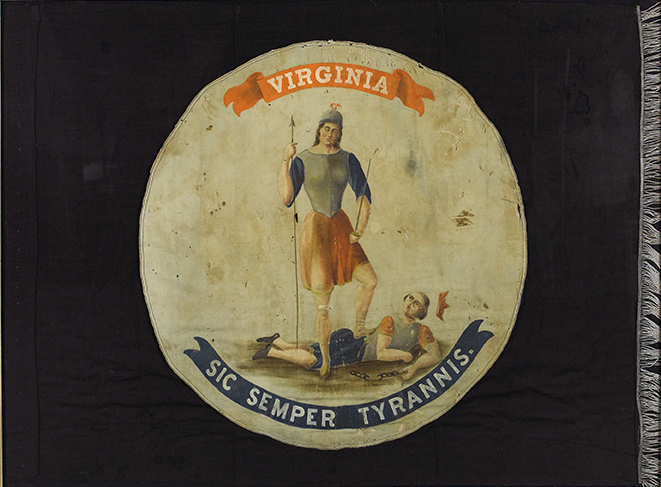
A surviving copy of the Civil War-era state flag

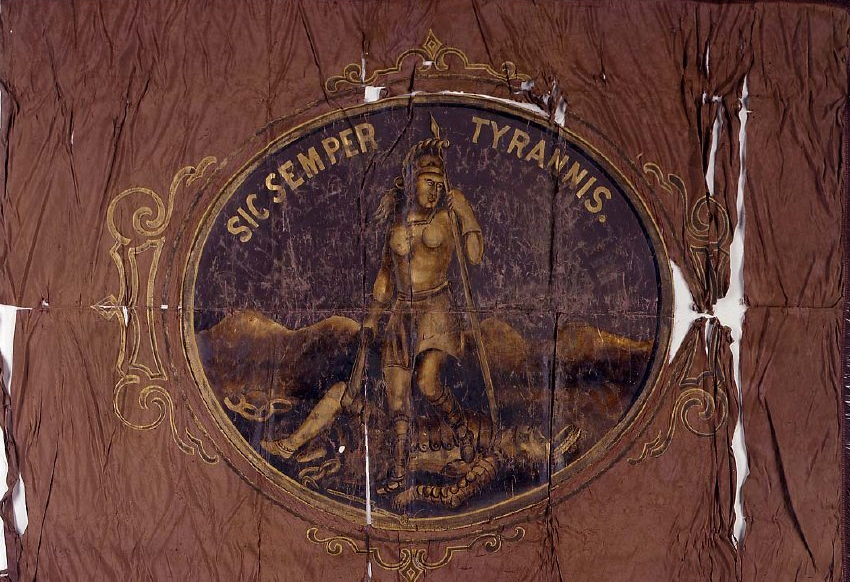
A surviving Virginia state flag c. August 1871

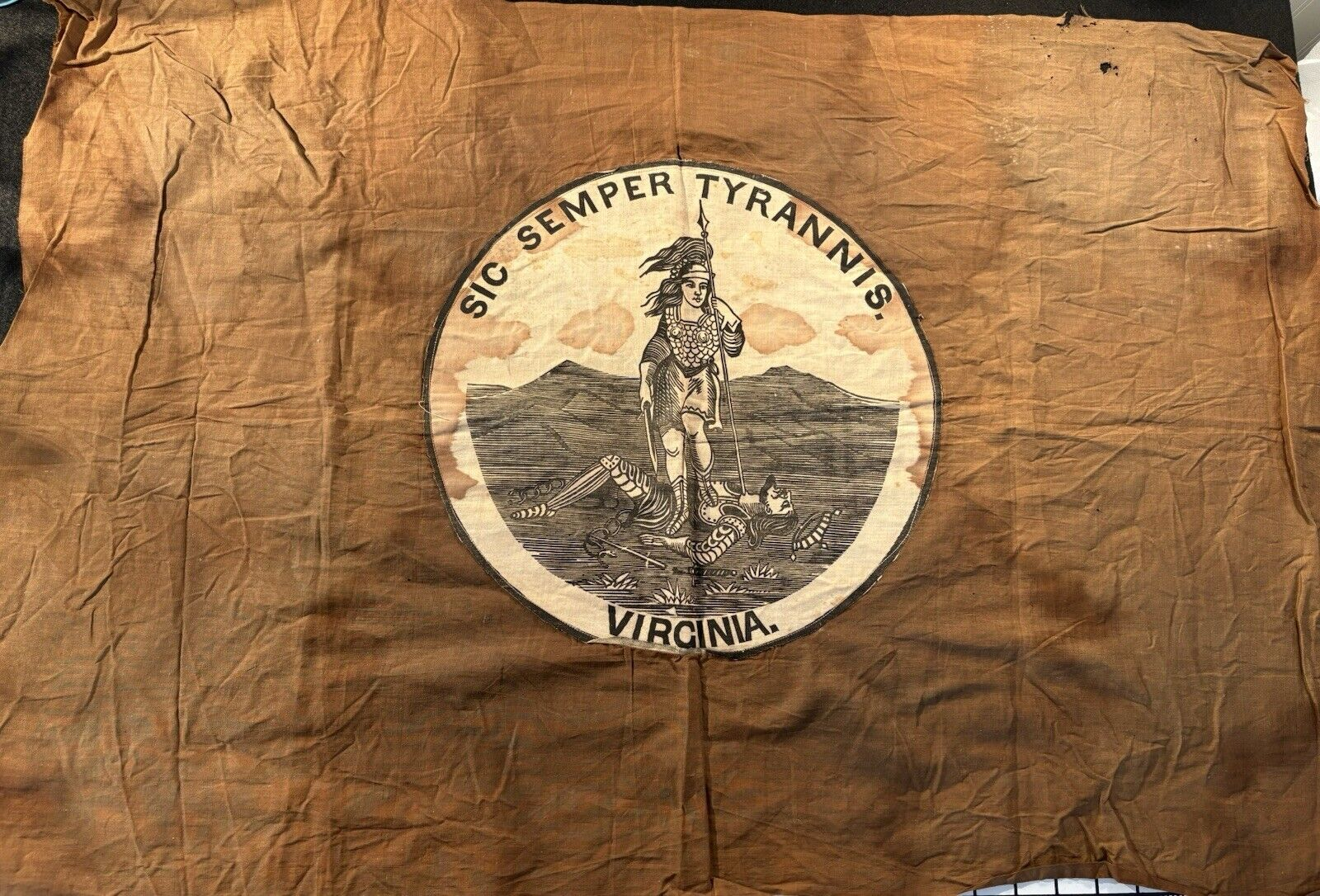
A surviving Virginia state flag with the 1904 state seal

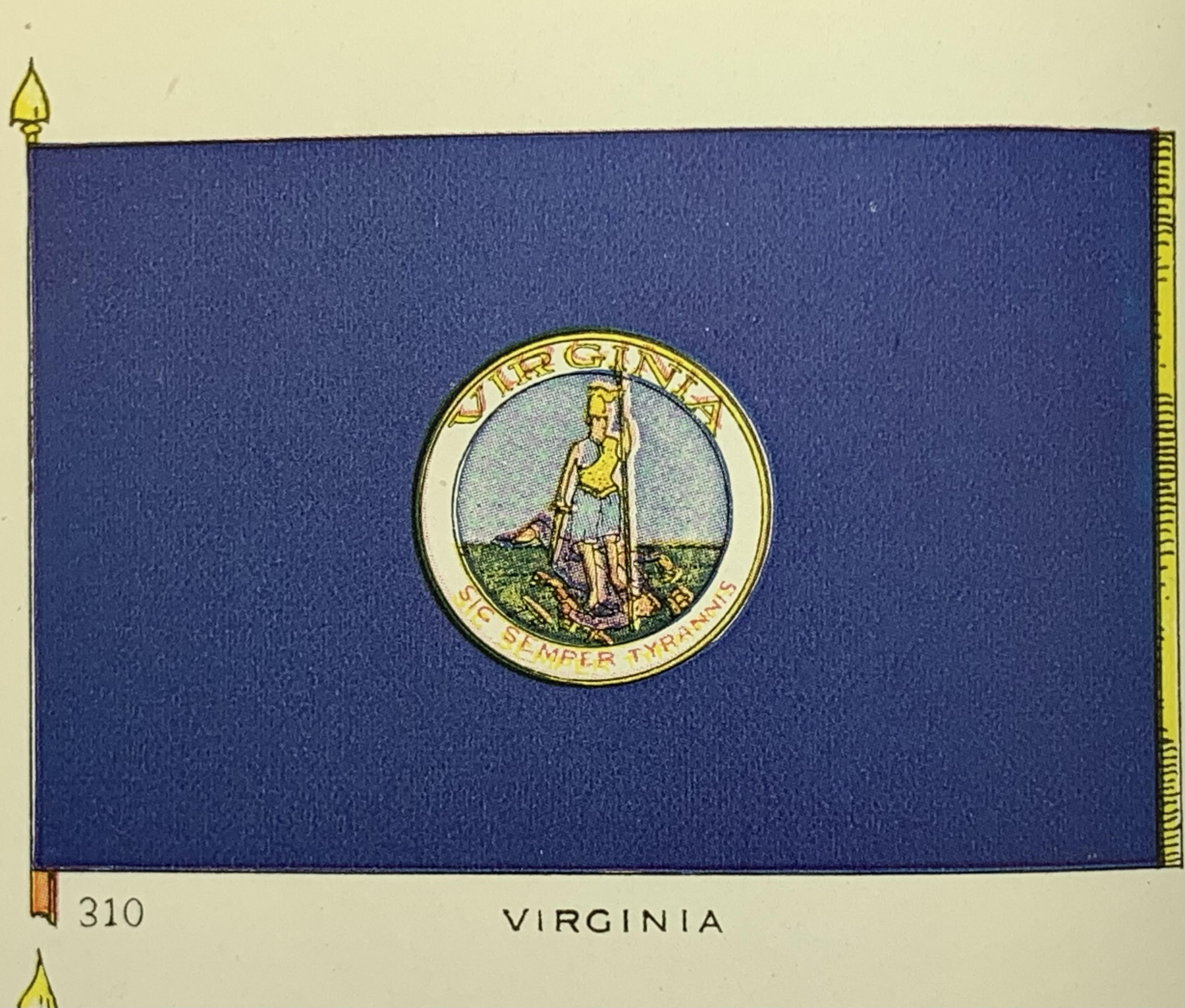
A depiction of the state flag from 1917

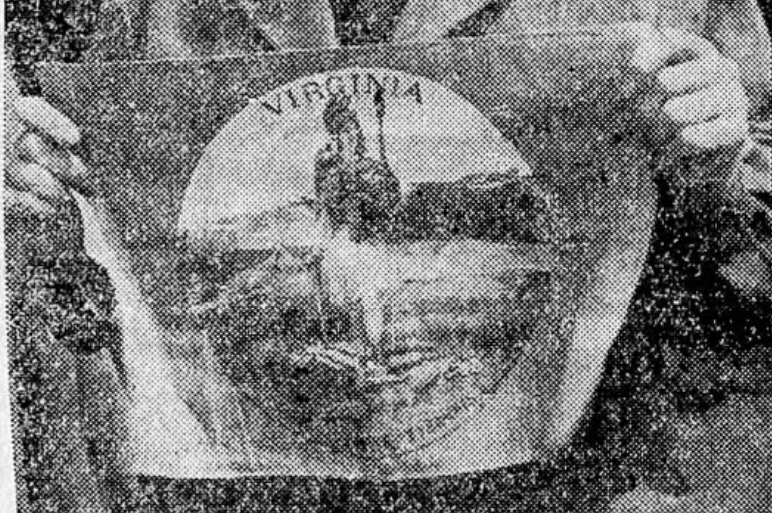
State flag from 1927

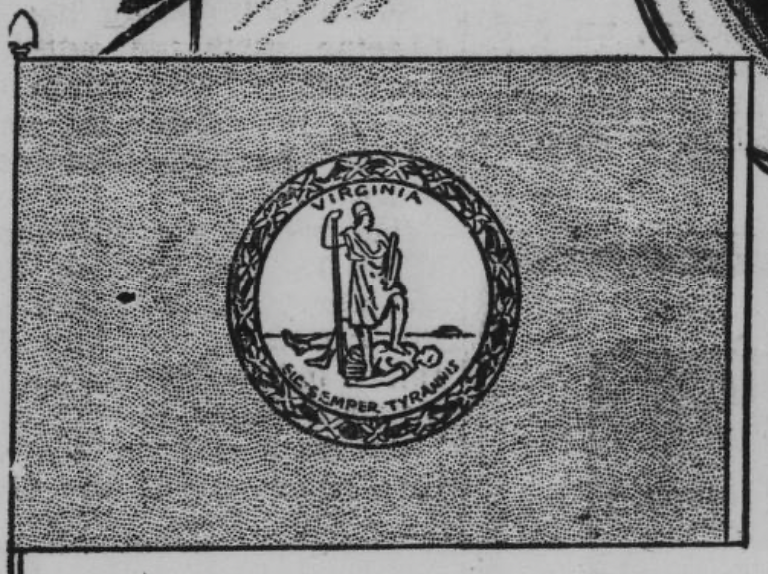
State flag from 1937

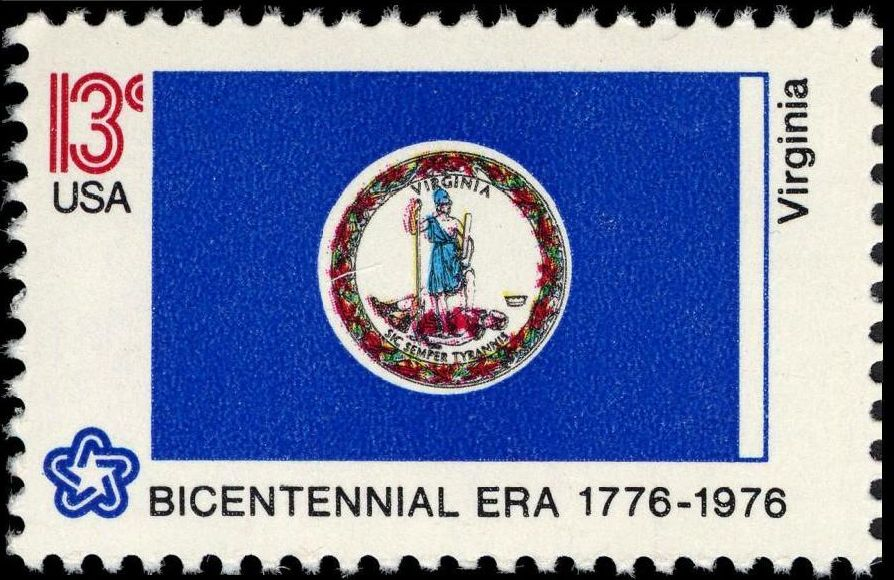
The Virginia state flag as depicted in the 1976 postage stamp commemorating the U.S. bicentennial, including silver fringe on the fly.

=== Controversies ===
The flag of Virginia has faced occasional controversy for its design. In 2010, then-Attorney General Ken Cuccinelli gave his staff lapel pins depicting an older version of the flag that lacked the exposed breast of Virtus. Similarly, in 2025, Lamar Consolidated Independent School District in Texas banned students from reading about the state of Virginia due to the exposed female breast depicted on the flag.

In 2024, Eugene Vindman, a Democratic politician, posed for a photograph with the Virginia state flag that was used during the American Civil War in the 1860s. After learning of his mistake, Vindman argued that Virginia should redesign its flag, as he believed that the Civil War flag and the current flag were too similar and easily confused.

== Legal description of seal ==
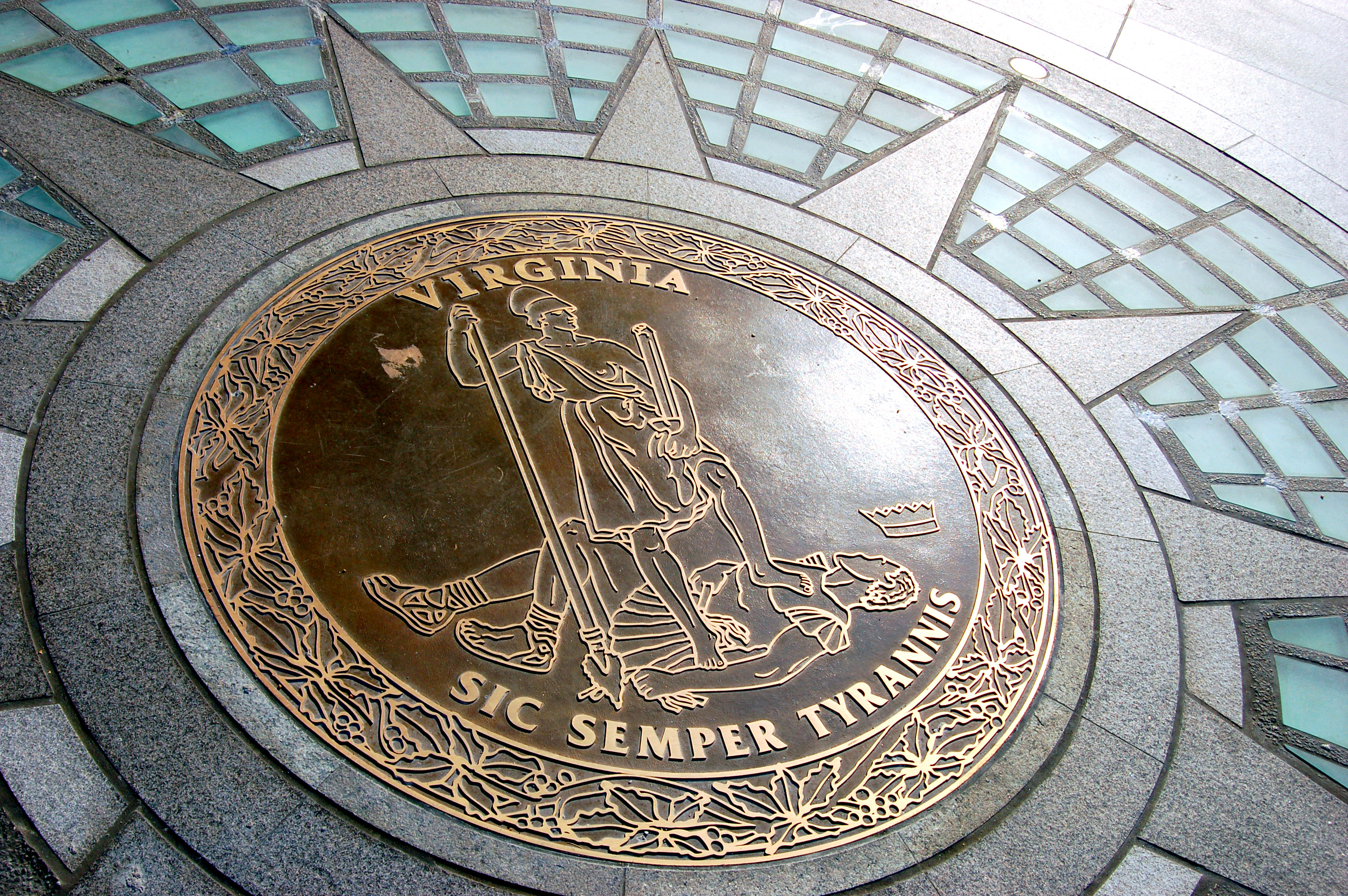
The state seal in front of the Virginia State Capitol Building.

The Seal of Virginia is officially described in the Code of Virginia (1950), §1-500, as follows:

The great seal of the Commonwealth of Virginia shall consist of two metallic discs, two and one-fourth inches in diameter, with an ornamental border one fourth of an inch wide, with such words and figures engraved thereon as will, when used, produce impressions to be described as follows: On the obverse, Virtus, the genius of the Commonwealth, dressed as an Amazon, resting on a spear in her right hand, point downward, touching the earth; and holding in her left hand, a sheathed sword, or parazonium, pointing upward; her head erect and face upturned; her left foot on the form of Tyranny represented by the prostrate body of a man, with his head to her left, his fallen crown nearby, a broken chain in his left hand, and a scourge in his right. Above the group and within the border conforming therewith, shall be the word "Virginia," and, in the space below, on a curved line, shall be the motto, "Sic Semper Tyrannis." On the reverse, shall be placed a group consisting of Libertas, holding a wand and pileus in her right hand; on her right, Aeternitas, with a globe and phoenix in her right hand; on the left of Libertas, Ceres, with a cornucopia in her left hand, and an ear of wheat in her right; over this device, in a curved line, the word "Perseverando."

Under Virginia state law, the secretary of the Commonwealth is also the Keeper of the Seals of the Commonwealth.

== Symbolism ==
=== Obverse ===
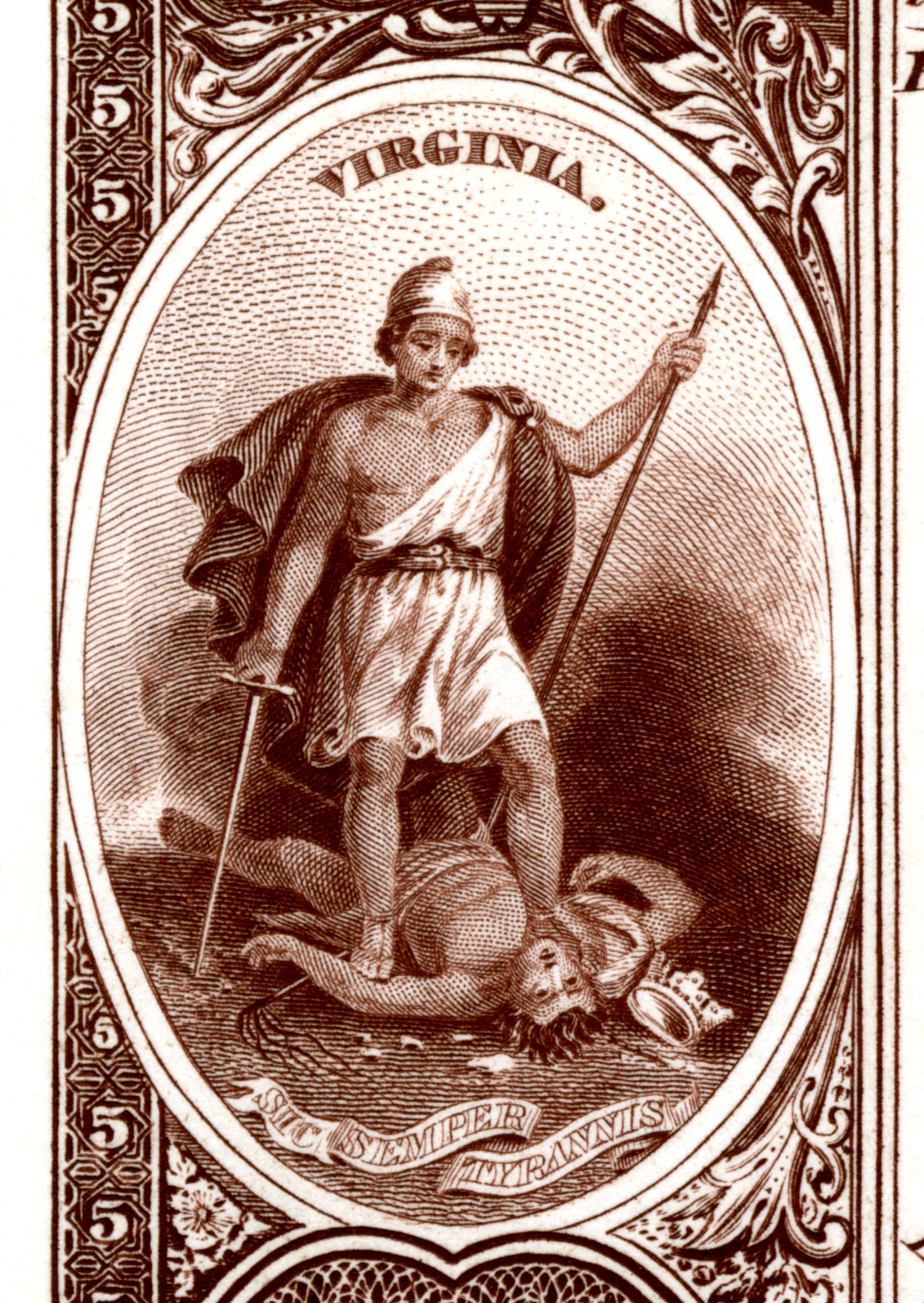
Virginia state seal depicted on the reverse of Series 1882BB National Bank Notes

The obverse of the seal is the official seal of Virginia and is used on all the official papers and documents of the Commonwealth's government, as well as on its flag. On this side, a female figure personifying the Roman virtue of virtus was selected to represent the genius of the new Commonwealth. Virginia's Virtus is a figure of peace, standing in a pose which indicates a battle already won. She rests on her long spear, its point turned downward to the ground. Her other weapon, a parazonium, is sheathed; it is the sword of authority rather than that of combat. Virtus is typically shown with a bare left breast; this is the only use of nudity among the seals of the U.S. states.

Tyranny lies supine beneath the foot of Virtus, symbolizing Great Britain's defeat by Virginia. The royal crown which has fallen to the ground beside him symbolizes the new republic's release from the monarchical control of Great Britain; Maryland, Virginia and New York are the only U.S. states with a flag or seal displaying a crown. The broken chain in Tyranny's left hand represents Virginia's freedom from Britain's restriction of colonial trade and westward expansion. The useless whip in his right hand signifies Virginia's relief from the torturing whip of acts of punishment such as the Intolerable Acts. His robe is purple, a reference to Julius Caesar and the Etruscan king of Rome, Tarquinius Priscus.

The motto selected for the obverse of the Virginia seal is Sic semper tyrannis, or in English, Thus always to tyrants. This is a derived quote from the famous event in Roman history, attributed to Brutus upon his participation in the slaying of Caesar. (Caesar had been named perpetual dictator of Rome in the same year, and some senators believed he had ambitions to abolish the Roman Republic and establish himself as a monarch.)

A joke referencing the image on the seal that dates as far back as the Civil War, is that "Sic semper tyrannis" actually means "Get your foot off my neck."

In 2010, Ken Cuccinelli, attorney general of Virginia, gave his staff lapel pins with Virtus's bosom covered by an armored breastplate. His spokesman, Brian Gottstein, said the pin was paid for by Cuccinelli's political action committee, not with taxpayer funds.

=== Reverse ===
The reverse of the seal pictures the blessings of freedom and peace, as represented by three Roman goddesses. In the center is the matron Libertas, the goddess of individual liberties. In her hand she holds a wand showing her magical gifts, and at the top of the wand hangs a Phrygian cap—also called a liberty cap—later made popular by French revolutionaries.

To the left of Libertas stands Ceres, the Roman goddess of agriculture. In her left hand is a horn of plenty overflowing with the abundance of Virginia's harvests, while in her right hand is an enormous stalk of wheat, representing one of Virginia's leading crops.

Aeternitas, representing Virginia's eternity, stands at the right of Libertas. In her right hand is a golden ball, an emblem of authority, and atop the ball is a phoenix, symbolizing immortality. On the Virginia seal, the phoenix represents effective government.

The motto gracing the reverse with its trio of Libertas, Ceres, and Aeternitas is Perseverando, or in English, Persevering, a reminder to future generations of the need to persist in maintaining the blessings of liberty. The ornamental border on both sides of the seal consists of sprigs of Parthenocissus quinquefolia, or commonly, Virginia creeper. In 1930 another committee was charged with standardizing the seal's design because of all the variations that came into use over the years. The seals that now adorn the doors of the Southern Portico of the Capitol in Richmond were designed by Charles Keck. What the committee approved was basically adopting the 1776 seal as the standard. In 1949, another standard was implemented, when Virginia's Art Commission defined the official color scheme for the seal.

The Great Seal and the lesser seal are the same except for size. The lesser seal is used on commissions of commonwealth officials and notaries, and on other papers which remain within the boundaries of, or relate only to, Virginia.

== Seal history ==
In May 1776 the Virginian colony declared its independence from Great Britain. On July 1, 1776, a committee of four was appointed to make a proper seal for the Commonwealth of Virginia. The four men were Richard Henry Lee, George Mason, George Wythe, and Robert Carter Nicholas Sr. Four days later, the committee's report for a design of the seal was read, and Mason presented it to the Virginia government. It was voted on and approved that same day. It is not known for certain which members of the committee were chiefly responsible for the design of the seal, but it is generally believed to be principally the work of Wythe.

The seal makers did not want a design which in any way resembled the style of coats of arms used in Great Britain. Because of the admiration for the Roman Republic felt by the Virginian leaders, the design of the new seal was two-sided and was taken from the mythology of Ancient Rome.

By 1912, many variants of the seal had become propagated, leading to confusion as to which was the actual seal. Thus, Virginia decided to standardize the design of the seal in order to avoid confusion.

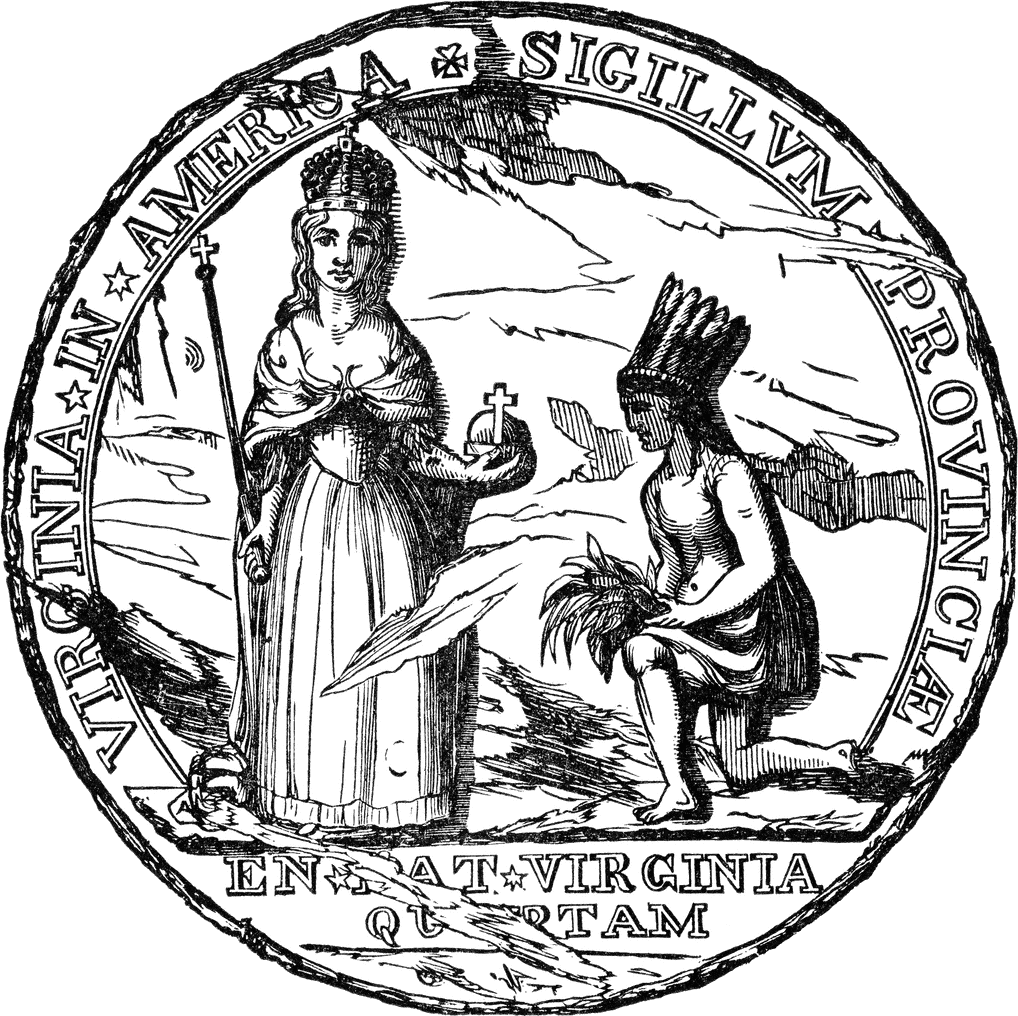
1714 seal

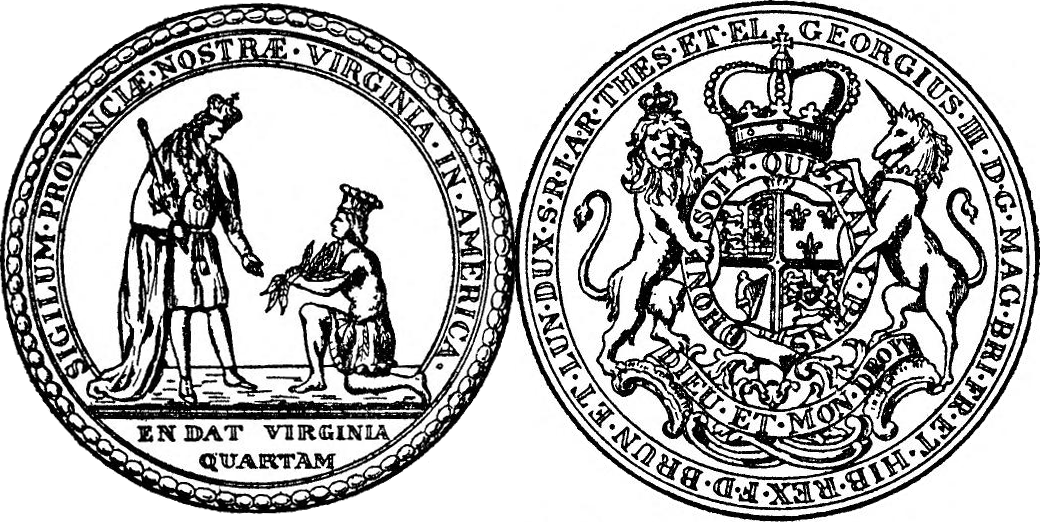
George III-era seal obverse and reverse

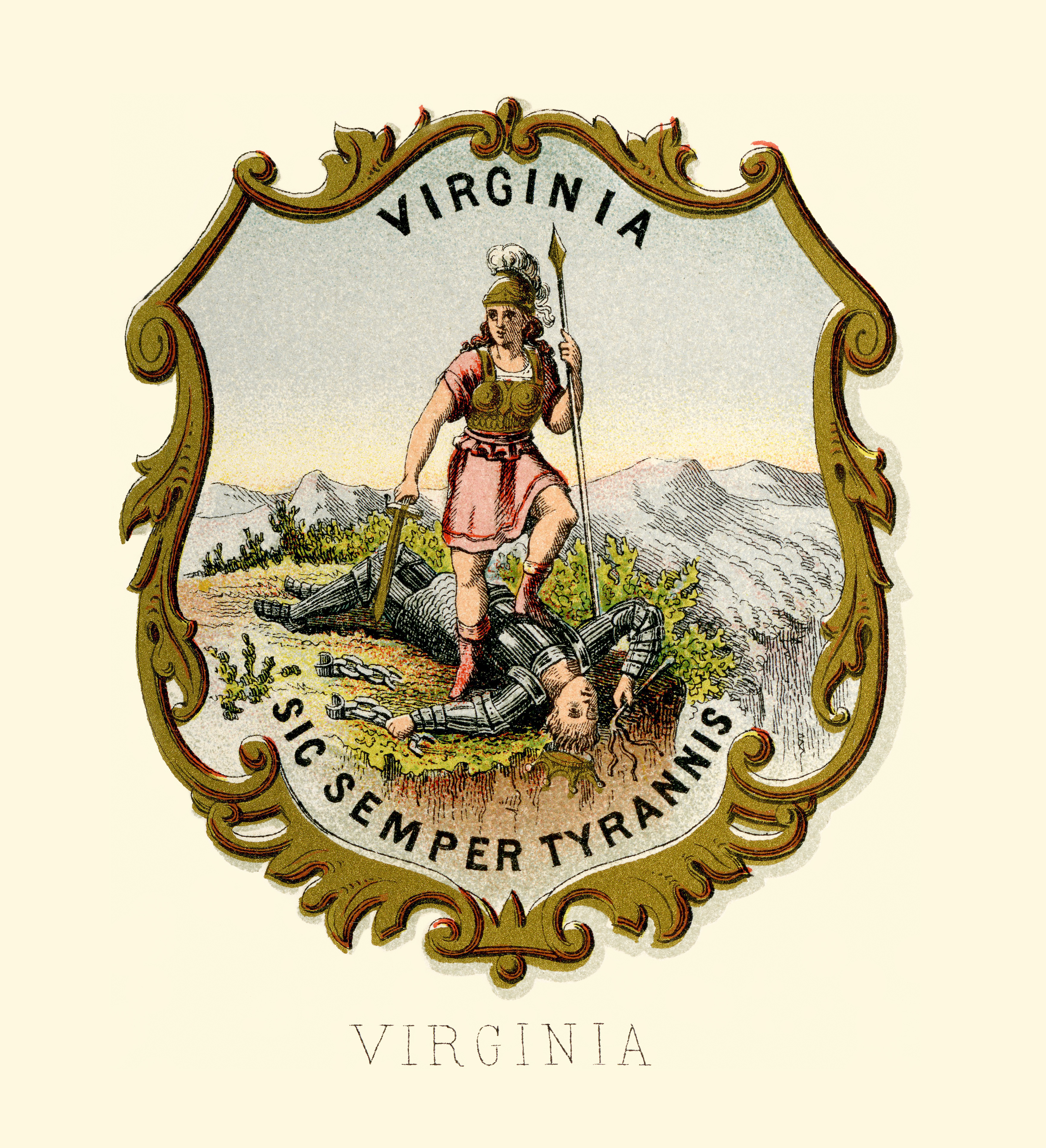
Virginia state historical coat of arms (illustrated, 1876)

=== Historical depictions of the seal ===
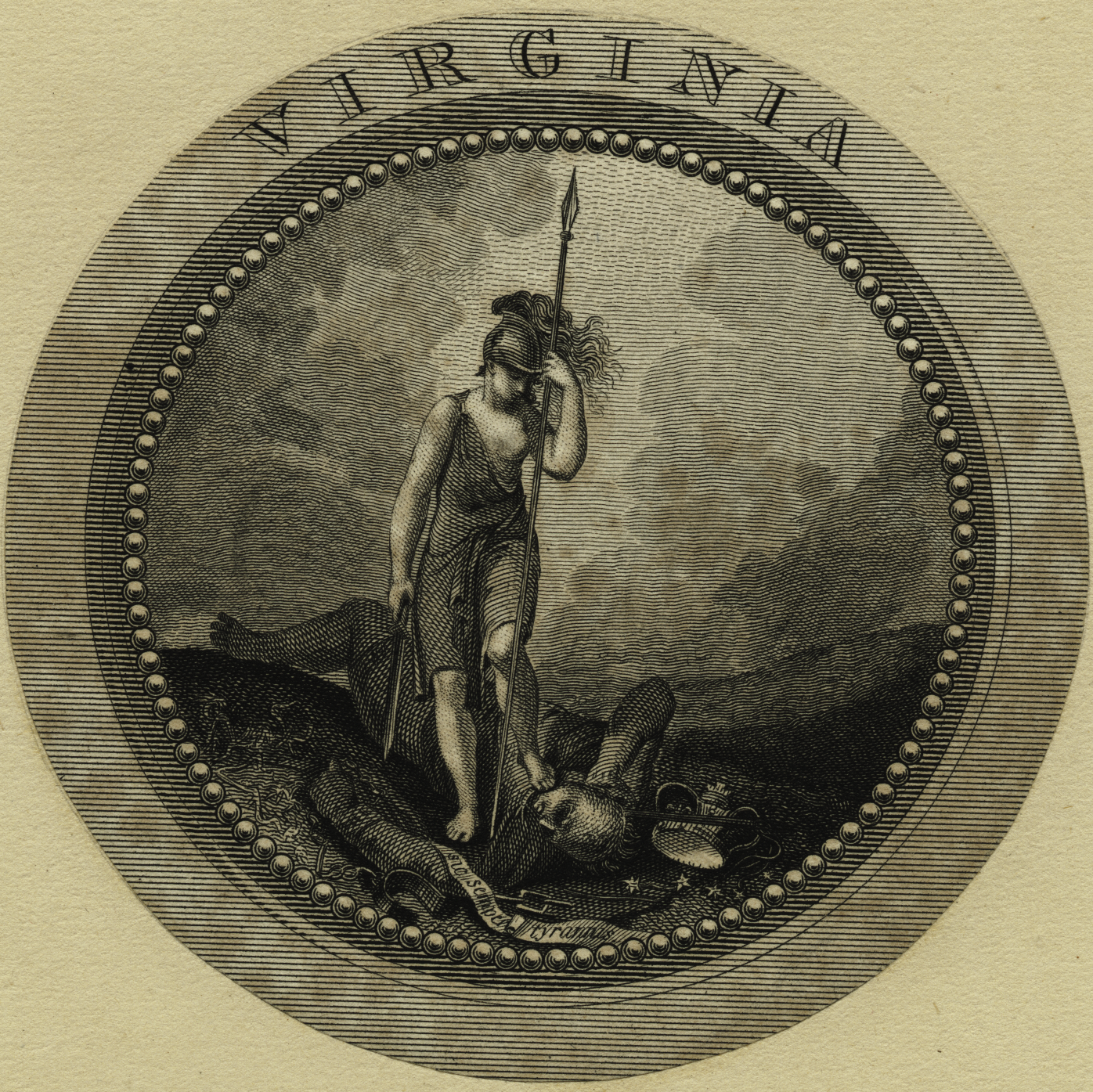
Seal of Virginia, c. 1850

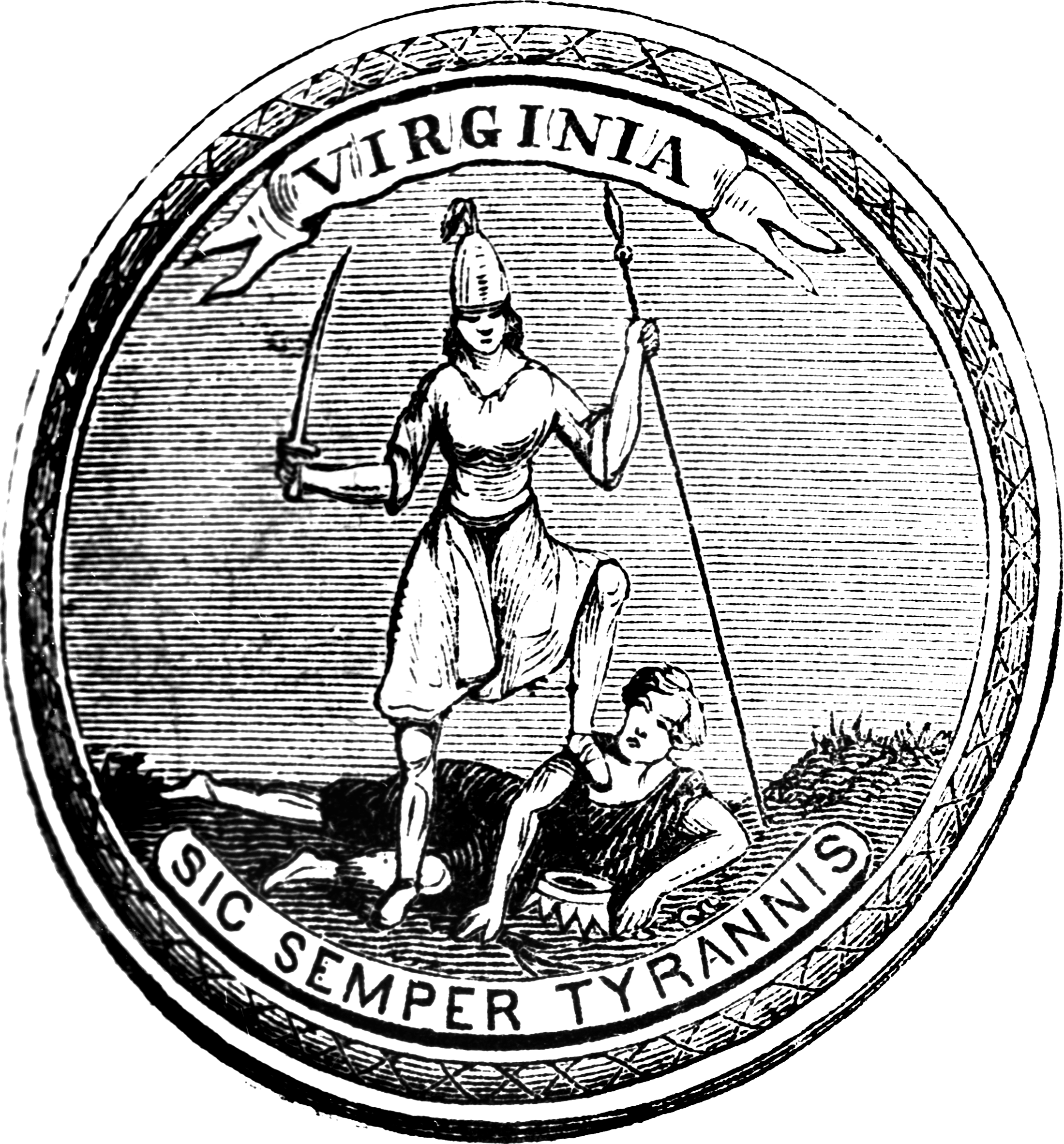
1851 seal obverse

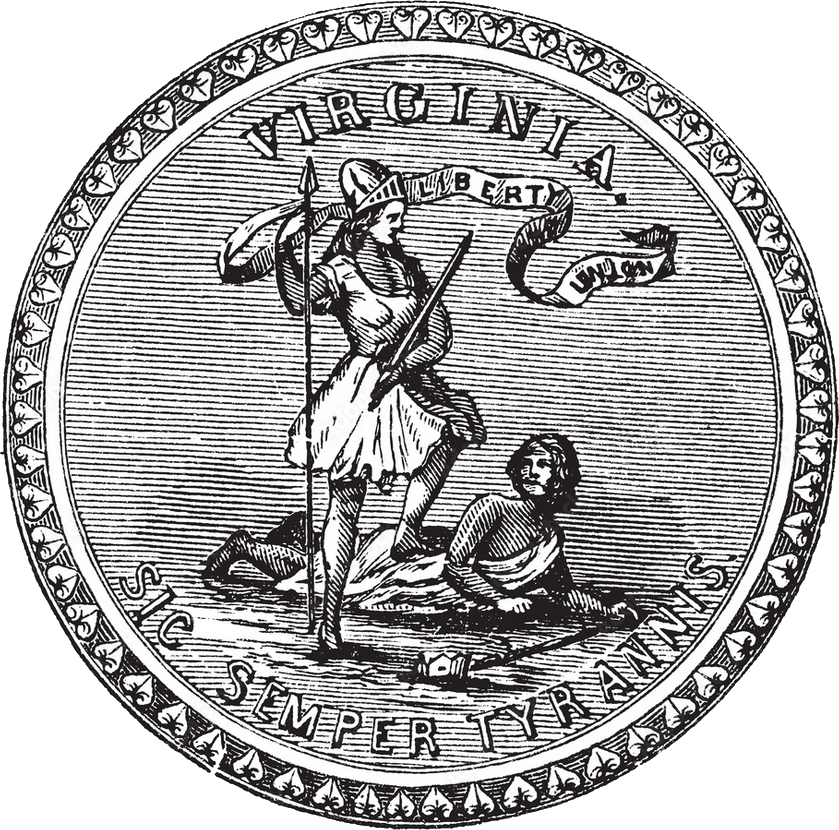
Seal of Virginia, 1865 to 1873

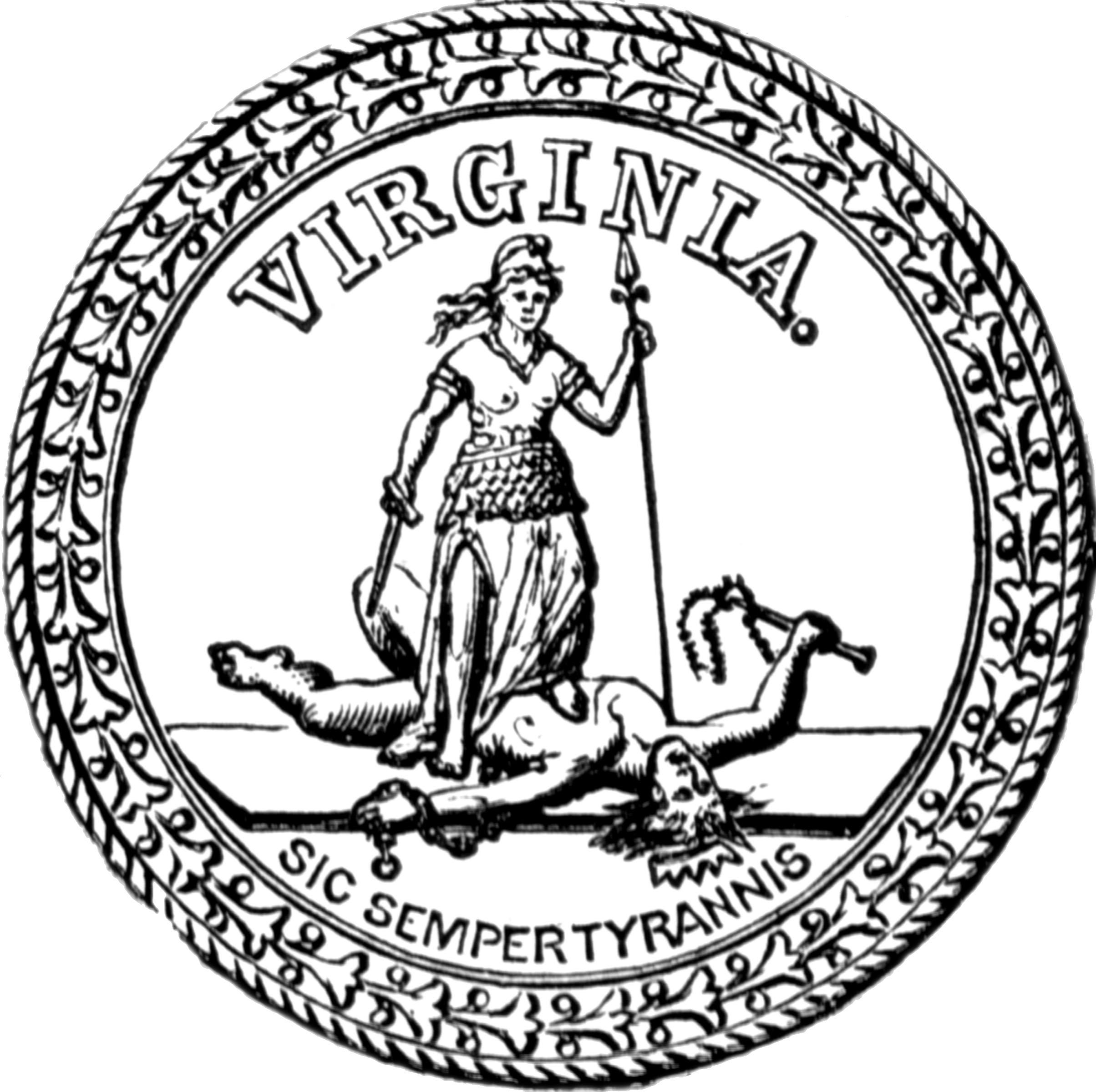
1875 seal obverse

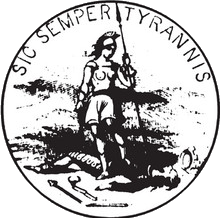
1876 seal obverse

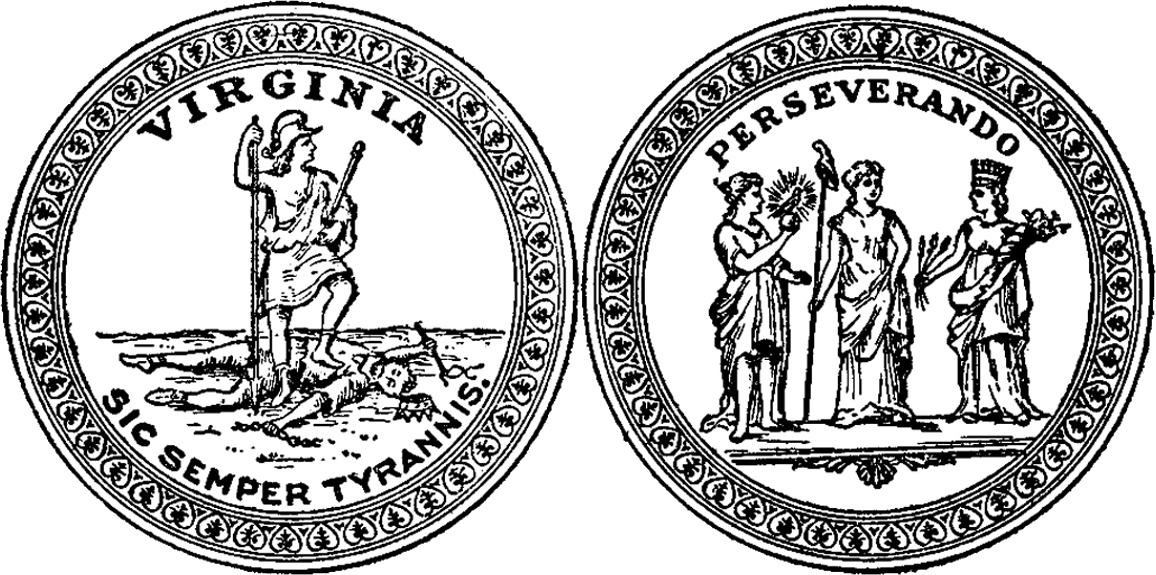
1894 seal obverse and reverse

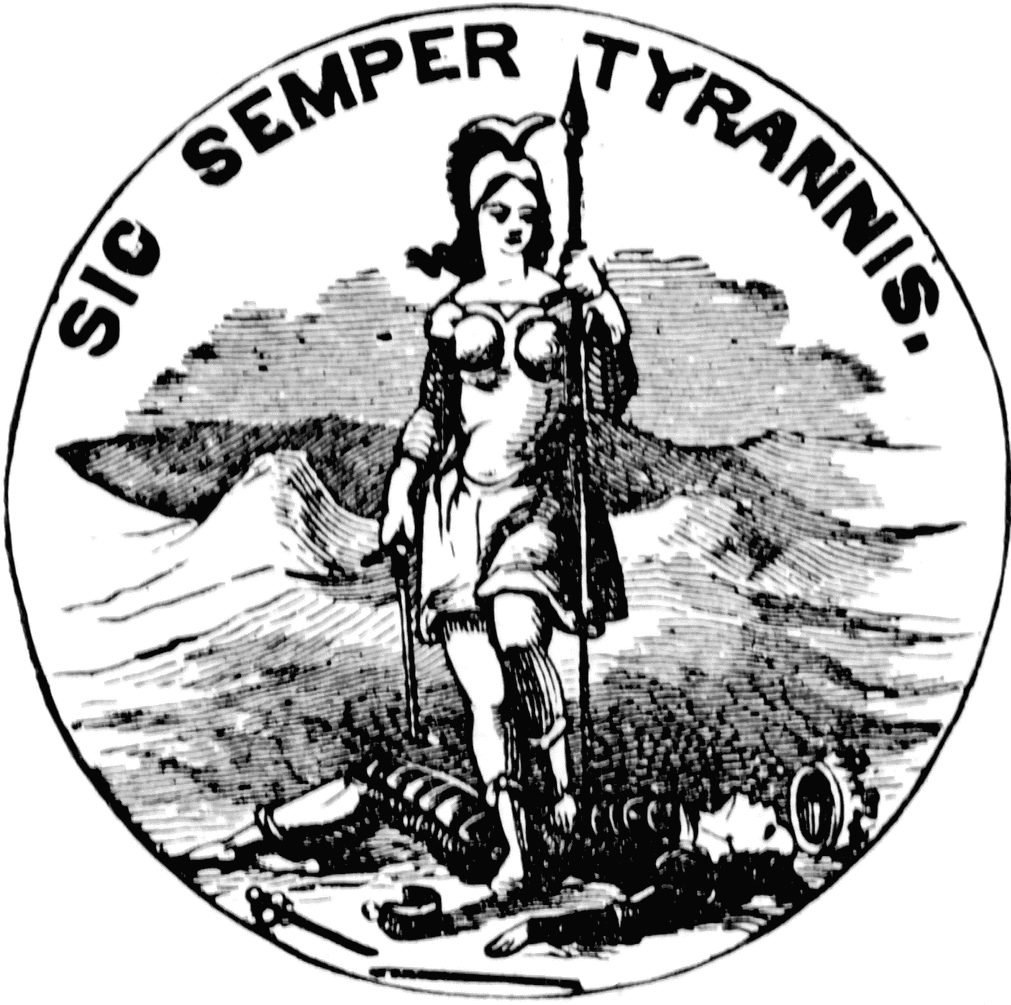
1904 seal obverse

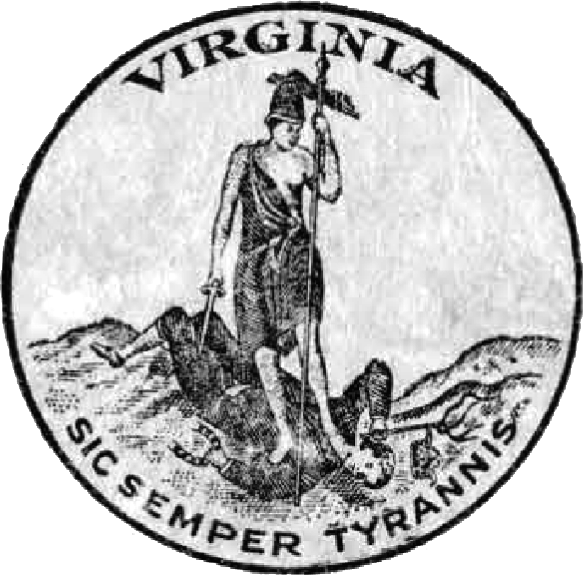
1928 seal obverse

== Coat of arms ==
Banner of arms used as flag of Virginia Company at the beginning of the 17th century.

At the University of Virginia on July 10, 1976, as part of her visit to celebrate the bi-centenary of the United States of America, Queen Elizabeth II presented the Governor of Virginia the Letters Patent of Garter, Clarenceux and Norroy and Ulster Kings of Arms dated June 3, 1976, which devised arms, crest and supporters for the Commonwealth of Virginia.

Because the design included the royal crown and quarterings of the royal arms, the Queen had to approve the design before the devisal could be made. The design was one used by the Virginia Merchants and Colony of Virginia from around 1620 until 1776.

Coat of arms of Commonwealth of Virginia
Adopted June 3, 1976 Escutcheon Argent a Cross Gules between four Escutcheons each ensigned with a Royal Crown those in the first and fourth quarters emblazoned with the Arms of France (modern) quartering those of England the Escutcheon in the second quarter with the Arms of Scotland and that in the third quarter with the Arms of Ireland. Supporters On either side a Man in Armour (circa 1620) with Sword sheathed proper garnished Or his breast plate Argent charged with a Cross Gules his helmet with beaver raised and adorned with three Ostrich Feathers Argent supporting with his exterior hand a Spear proper tipped Argent. Motto En Dat Virginia Quintam

== Governmental seals ==
Seal of the Supreme Court of Virginia

Seal of the State Corporation Commission of Virginia

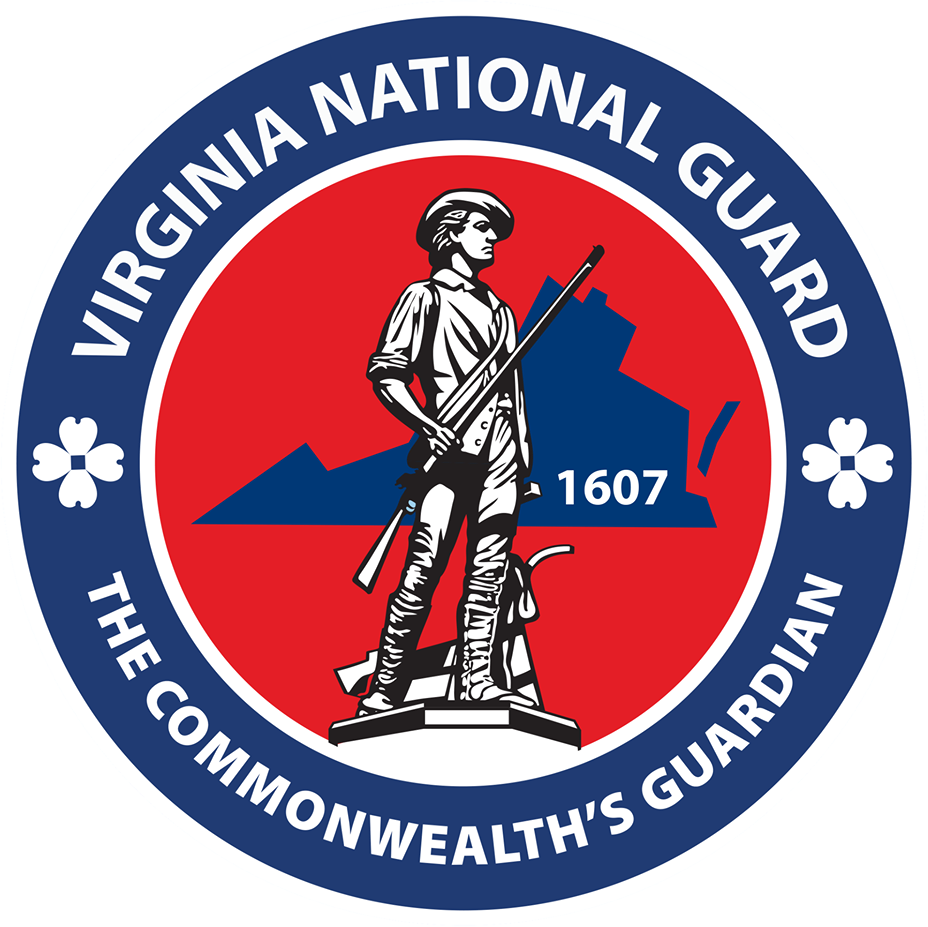
Seal of the Virginia National Guard

Seal of the Virginia Senate
