= Richard Ramsdell =

- Born: 1957 (age 68–69); Gloversville, New York, U.S.
- Website: studioramsdell.com

Richard Ramsdell (born 1957) is an American artist working primarily with the assemblage and re-appropriation of photographs and paintings.

== Early life and education ==
Ramsdell was born in Gloversville, New York.

== Career ==
In 1991, Ramsdell received a Southern Arts Federation NEA fellowship for his work. The following year he was an Artist in Residence at the Ecole Nationale de la Photographie in Arles, France. He received a second NEA fellowship from the Southern Arts Federation in 1995.

=== Style ===
At first working in black and white, Ramsdell later created larger pieces with color photography and Photoshop. In 1994, Sarasota Magazine described Ramsdell's art as "large scale, photo-based pieces from found images which address contemporary social issues" and as "works of photo-collage incorporating words and symbols". In 2000, Carolina Arts noted that Ramsdell "has chosen to work in a way that emphasizes the role of the computer in [his] photography, despite the fact that manipulation of images in the computer can be done in a manner that is almost undetectable".

His piece "Number 11, 1996", exhibited at Featuring Florida '96, "consists of almost 400 sheets of paper, 8-by-11 inches, printed on a Hewlett-Packard DeskJet 1600 printer in color and arranged to represent a man in a business suit from the waist down, as if to say the heart and head are no longer needed in the world of computers". Another piece, "1995-27", exhibited at Featuring Florida '98, is "a 20-foot-wide photo assemblage of a falling figure, an upside-down church and dental X-rays into one ink-jet print".

=== Notable works ===
In 1981, Ramsdell created the image "1981-24" from a family snapshot taken in 1959 for his M.F.A. thesis project at the University of Florida. In 2009 the image was appropriated from Ramsdell's website by a yet unknown person and posted to the Thomas Ligotti website. It was reposted thousands of times after acquiring a metaphysical backstory and became known as the "Cooper Family Falling Body Photo". In 2015, it became a topic of discussion in the Metabunk.org forums of Mick West. In May 2025, the history of the image was covered by Jeffiot in the YouTube video The Story Behind This Perfectly Normal Photo.

== Personal life ==
Ramsdell lived in Sarasota, Florida for more than 40 years. He lives with his wife in Oneonta, New York as of 2025.

== Exhibitions ==
=== Solo ===
- Innuendo (Southeast Museum of Photography, 1994)
- Richard Ramsdell (Blue Sky, Oregon Center for the Photographic Arts, 1995)

=== Group ===
- Perspective Perspective (Florida Center for Contemporary Art, 1988)
- National Showcase Exhibition (Alternative Museum, NYC, 1992)
- Third Annual New York Digital Salon, (School of Visual Arts, NYC, 1995)
- Featuring Florida '96 (Ringling Museum of Art, 1996)
- Featuring Florida '98 (Ringling Museum of Art, 1998)
- USF Art Department Faculty & Alumni Exhibition (University of South Florida Contemporary Art Museum, 1999)
- Making Pictures (Asheville Art Museum, 2000)
- 2025 Regional Art Exhibition (Roberson Museum, 2025)
