= Jeri McCormick =

American poet

Jeri McCormick is a Wisconsin-based American poet with Appalachian roots and strong ties to Ireland.

== Biography ==
Jeri McCormick received a Master's Degree from the University of Wisconsin–Madison where her work was subsequently recognized by the Women's Studies program.

McCormick founded Fireweed Press where she has edited and published dozens of books by major poets. She also cofounded and edited Primipara journal (1974-1984) devoted to poetry written by women. McCormick taught creative writing in senior centers and Elderhostel programs for twenty-five years, while co-editing reference books for teachers of older writers and a magazine for older writers, Heartland Journal. McCormick has published five books of her own poetry in the U.S. and Ireland, and her poems appear in sixteen anthologies, including The Book of Irish American Poetry: From the 18th Century to the Present.

McCormick's works have received wide acclaim and won American and international poetry awards, including the Wisconsin Fellowship of Poets' Muse Prize twice (2007, 2019), Wisconsin Arts Board Fellowship (1997), Outstanding Achievement Award from the Wisconsin Library Association (1999), Rosebud Poetry Award (2019), and Ireland’s Davoren Hanna International Competition (2001). After four consecutive Honorable Mentions in the Wisconsin People & Ideas poetry contest, McCormick won a third place prize in 2019. She has served as a judge in poetry contests as well. She is often invited to read her work publicly, including large events such as the 2013 Milwaukee Irish Fest and 2019 Wisconsin Book Festival. Her work teaching creative writing to older adults has been studied for its therapeutic effects.

== Publications ==
- Poetry Out of Wisconsin V. With Mardi Fries (eds.) Madison, WI: Wisconsin Fellowship of Poets, 1980.
- Writers Have No Age. With Lenore Coberly, Karen Updike (eds.) New York, NY: Haworth Press, 1984.
- The Sun Rides in Your Ribcage. Madison, WI: Fireweed Press, 1987.
- When It Came Time. County Clare, Ireland: Salmon Poetry, 1998.
- Love Over Sixty. With Robin Chapman (eds.) Bay City, MI: Mayapple Press, 2010.
- Marrowbone of Memory: Ireland's Great Famine. County Clare, Ireland: Salmon Poetry, 2012.
- Breathtaking. Madison, WI: Hummingbird Press, 2019.
