= J. Kevin McMahon =

J. Kevin McMahon is the former president and CEO of the Pittsburgh Cultural Trust, a $50 million private, nonprofit agency in Pittsburgh, Pennsylvania.

The trust, established in 1984, promotes the cultural and economic growth of downtown Pittsburgh through the development of a fourteen-block arts and entertainment center in downtown Pittsburgh—the Cultural District.

He was its second president, following Carol Brown, who retired in 2000.

== Biography ==
McMahon holds an MBA from the City University of New York and an undergraduate degree in economics and psychology from Hiram College.

Prior to his current role, McMahon was a development officer from 1983 to 1992 for The New School in New York City and executive vice president of the Kennedy Center in Washington, D.C. from 1992 to 2001.

He also teaches as an adjunct professor for the Heinz College at Carnegie Mellon University.
