= Sic semper tyrannis =

Latin phrase

Sic semper tyrannis is a Latin phrase meaning 'thus always to tyrants'. In contemporary parlance, it means tyrannical governments will inevitably be violently opposed, and eventually toppled. It is the state motto of the U.S. commonwealth of Virginia. The phrase was uttered by John Wilkes Booth after he shot Abraham Lincoln on April 14, 1865. Booth wrote in his diary that he shouted this in part because of its association with the assassination of Caesar.

== Other usages of the phrase ==
The obverse side of the seal of Virginia

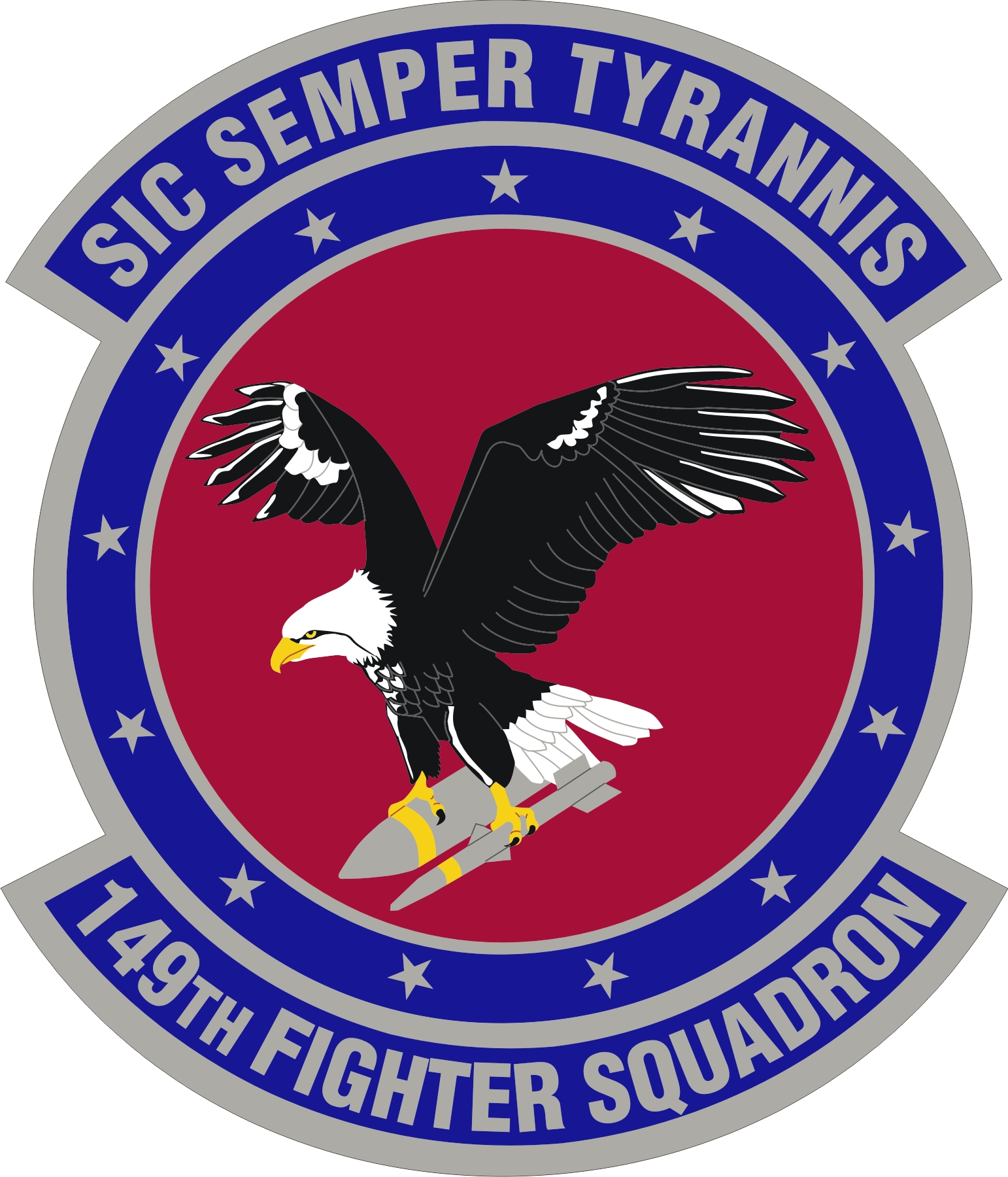
The Insignia of the 149th Fighter Squadron

The phrase was recommended by George Mason to the Virginia Convention in 1776, as part of the commonwealth's seal. The Seal of the Commonwealth of Virginia shows Virtue, spear in hand, with her foot on the recumbent form of Tyranny, whose crown lies nearby. The Seal was planned by Mason (designed by George Wythe) who signed the United States Declaration of Independence and taught law to Thomas Jefferson.

A joke referencing the image on the seal that dates as far back as the Civil War, is that "Sic semper tyrannis" actually means "Get your foot off my neck."

"Happy While United" was the slogan on a medal coined by the State of Virginia in 1780. First envisioned by Thomas Jefferson, the medal was minted and designed to be given to Native American signatories to the treaties Jefferson planned with the Native Americans of Virginia. The medal portrays a Virginia colonial, sitting, enjoying a peace pipe with a Native American. The obverse portrays a variation of the Virginia state seal of the state symbol standing triumphant over a slain enemy with the legend: "Rebellion to Tyrants Is Obedience to God".

The phrase is the motto of the United States Navy attack submarine named for the state, the USS Virginia (SSN-774). Before that, it was the motto of the nuclear-powered cruiser USS Virginia (CGN-38).

The phrase appears on the Insignia of the 149th Fighter Squadron which is located at Joint Base Langley–Eustis, Virginia.

John Tyler's father, John Tyler Sr., uttered the phrase to a schoolteacher who had been tied up by the younger Tyler and his fellow pupils.

In her non-fiction polemical A Key to Uncle Tom's Cabin, Harriet Beecher Stowe noted the irony of runaway slave ads appearing in Southern newspapers with nameplate mottos like Sic semper tyrannis and "Resistance to tyrants is obedience to God".

During the Civil War, at least one regiment of the United States Colored Troops used it as their motto.

Timothy McVeigh, the perpetrator of the Oklahoma City Bombing on April 19, 1995, wore a shirt on the day of the bombing with a picture of Lincoln and the phrase "Sic semper tyrannis," printed on it.

The phrase was also in the pro-Confederate Civil War song "Maryland, My Maryland", which was popular with Southern sympathizers in Maryland. The song "Maryland, My Maryland", was the official state song of Maryland from 1939 until its repeal by that state's general assembly in 2021 (effective July 1, 2021).

The phrase is also the motto of Allentown, Pennsylvania, the third largest city in Pennsylvania.

== See also ==
- Tyrannicide
- Et tu, Brute?
- Right of revolution
