= Parazonium =

Type of dagger

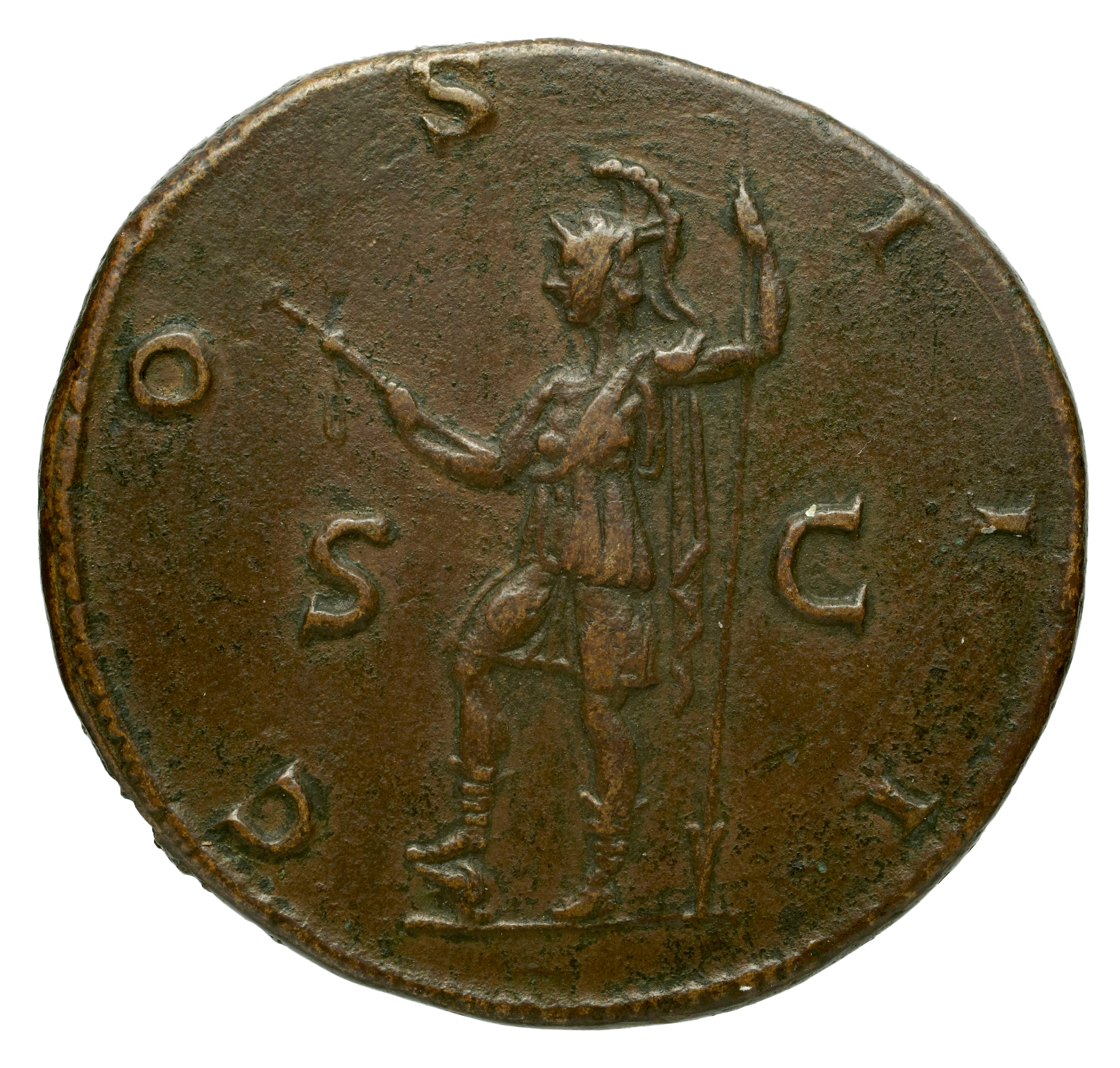
Virtus extending a parazonium on a sestertius issued under Hadrian

A parazonium is a long triangular dagger, wide at the hilt end and coming to a point. In Roman iconography, it is frequently carried by Virtus, particularly in early representations of the deity, Mars, and Dea Roma, as well as the emperor, military tribunes and other senior officers, giving them the aura of courage.

In Roman statuary, the weapon is cradled in the bearer's left arm or, on Trajan's Column, for example, it is stuck into the left side of the officer's chest band. Existing examples on statuary show that the parazonium's scabbard shape is a direct copy of the few existing Greek parazonia on display at various Greek museums. The weapon's hilt, grip, and pommel are not copies of the Greek style. The pommel cap is either an eagle's head or a bi-lobed pommel. The details of the hand grip on the statues are no longer clear after 2,000 years. The guards, contrary to some reports, are authentic and are a rather theatrical "S" shape with inset detail. The Roman parazonium blade tended to be leaf shape and approximately 15–19 in (380–480 mm) long.

== Application ==
Its function as a weapon is confirmed directly or indirectly by other written sources, mainly inscriptions (e.g. CGIL II 164.33 ; 394.38). One of them (CGIL V 384, 33) clearly shows that the Romans were to borrow this weapon from the "Macedonians" (i.e. Greeks) of the Hellenistic East, who had earlier adopted it in turn from the Persians (the sword akinakes).

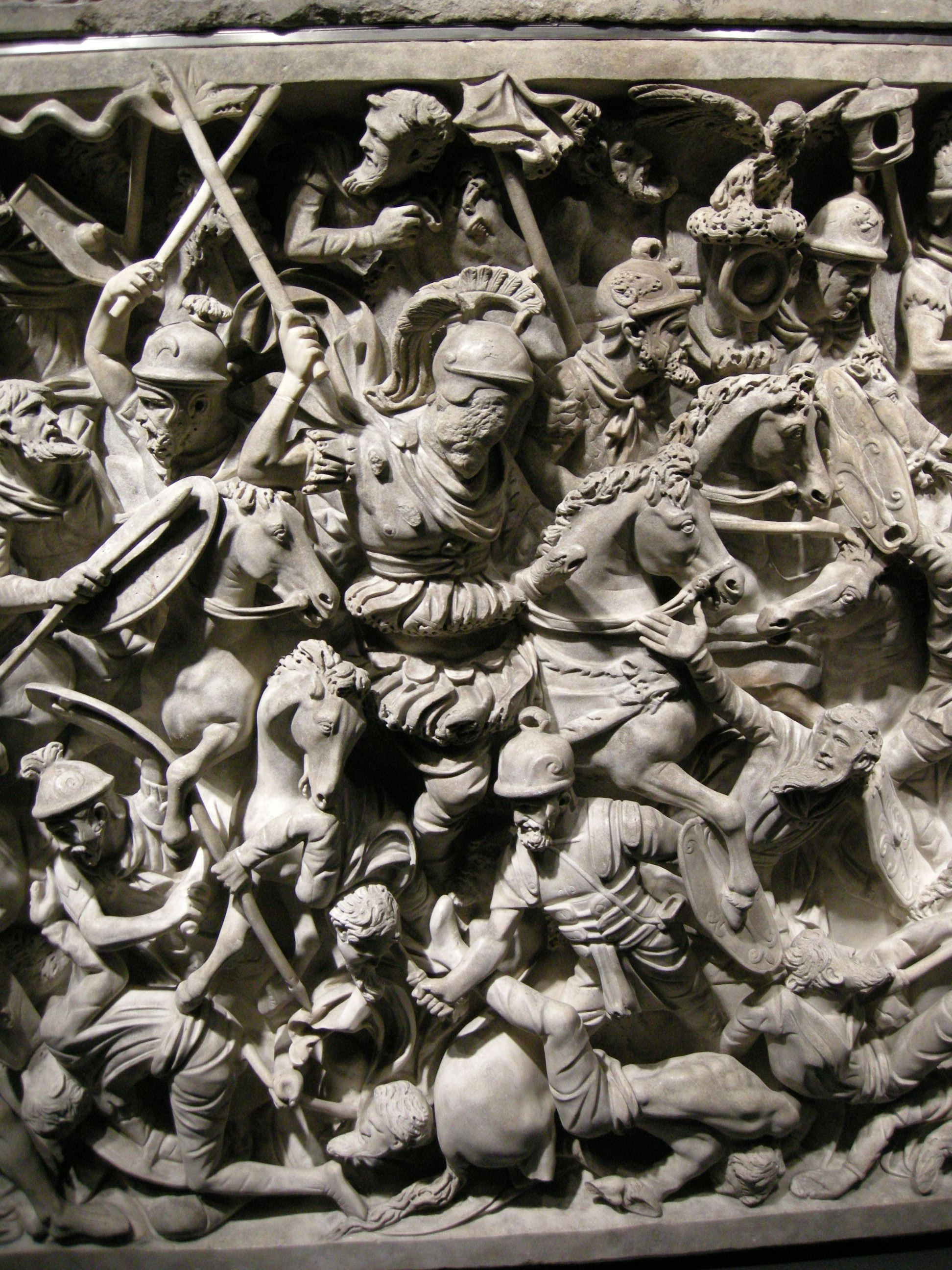
Commander with a parazonium (center) during hand-to-hand combat (fragment of the Portonaccio sarcophagus scene)

The use of the Roman parazonium tended to be somewhat theatrical in the sense that it was a mark of rank and it was used to rally the troops. It is known that the Roman army initially used the parazonium even for combat purposes; gradually, however, from the second century BCE it appears the normal procedure was for the officer to exchange his parazonium for a gladius or a spatha if he was directly threatened during a battle; though it was still a viable weapon.

Militiae decus hoc gratique erit omen honoris, arma tribunicium cingere digna latus.	A soldier’s distinction this will be and an omen of a welcome honor, arms worthy to gird the side of a tribune.

== See also ==
- Military tribune
- Acinaces
- Flag and seal of Virginia
