= Virginia Commission for the Arts =

State agency

The Virginia Commission for the Arts (VCA), is the state agency that supports the arts through funding from the Virginia General Assembly and the National Endowment for the Arts.

The Commission was created in 1968, is governed by 9 Commissioners appointed to five-year terms by the Governor and confirmed by the General Assembly of Virginia. The Commission is led by an Executive Director, and Deputy Director, appointed by the Governor.

The Virginia Commission for the Arts is a member of the National Assembly of State Arts Agencies, and a State Partner with the Mid Atlantic Arts Foundation.

The Virginia Commission for the Arts adopted its first-ever Cultural Equity Statement in 2018. The Statement on Cultural Equity is as follows: "To support a full creative life for all, the Virginia Commission for the Arts commits to championing policies and practices of cultural equity that foster a just, inclusive, and equitable Commonwealth."
