= Wisconsin Arts Board =

State agency

The Wisconsin Arts Board (WAB) is a state agency based in Madison, Wisconsin. It is one of fifty-six state art agencies of the United States and works as a partner regionally with Arts Midwest and nationally with the National Endowment of the Arts. The Arts Board's mission statement declares that it “is the state agency which nurtures creativity, cultivates expression, promotes the arts, supports the arts in education, stimulates community and economic development and serves as a resource for people of every cultural heritage.”

== History ==
The statutory agency known as the WAB was preceded by the privately funded Wisconsin Arts Foundation and Council (WAFC). Established in 1956, the WAFC organized conferences, published a quarterly arts calendar, and worked for state support of the arts. It changed its name to the Wisconsin Arts Council (WAC) in 1970 and in 1977 became the Wisconsin Foundation for the Arts.

In 1963, Governor John Reynolds created the Governor's Council of the Arts in order to promote the arts throughout the state. The Council did this particularly by establishing the Governor's Awards, but it did not receive state funding. The WAFC and the Governor's Council worked as separate entities.

In 1965, the newly elected Governor Warren P. Knowles dissolved the Governor's Council of the Arts and designated the WAFC as “the official state coordinating group of the arts.” Under its new designation the WAFC continued the Governor's Awards and received a study grant from the National Endowment of the Arts to investigate the formation of a state funded arts council. In 1967–1968, Governor Knowles introduced a bill to establish a state supported arts council, but the measure was tabled.

Under the urging of the WAC, Governor Patrick Lucey introduced a clause into the 1973-1975 budget bill to create and publicly fund a state arts council. On August 2, 1973, the Wisconsin Arts Board was established by the Wisconsin Legislature in Section 20. 15.53 of Wisconsin Assembly Bill 300. The newly formed Board elected Gerald Bartell as the first Chairperson of the Wisconsin Arts Board. The Board then hired Jerrold Rouby as the first Executive Director. Within four years, the Wisconsin Arts Board granted funds for projects in 71 of Wisconsin’s 72 counties.

In 1980, The state legislature established Wisconsin’s Percent for Art Program as part of the Arts Board’s work, for the purpose of placing artwork in public settings. In 1981, with support from the National Endowment for the Arts, The Wisconsin Arts Board created its Folk Arts Program. The Wisconsin Presenters network (WPN) formed with the help of the Wisconsin Arts Board in 1981. In 1985, The Arts Board piloted the Folk Arts Apprenticeship Program. Initially, the program focused on serving the Native American communities of Wisconsin. This iteration of the program ran from 1985-1997. In 1989, the state legislature established the Arts Incubator Program.

In 1991, the Arts Board developed an advisory committee, “Access to the Arts for Persons with Disabilities,” and hosted the annual meeting of the National Assembly of State Arts Agencies in Milwaukee and convened with Wisconsin artists to create the Wisconsin Assembly of Local Arts Agencies (now Create Wisconsin). In 1993, the Wisconsin Arts Board became a founding member of the Cultural Coalition of Wisconsin. In 1995, the state legislature established the Wisconsin Regranting Program, which provided grants to local arts agencies and municipalities that were in turn matched with local dollars and granted out in support of local arts projects. In 1998, The Arts Board was centrally involved in Wisconsin’s celebration of its Sesquicentennial, co-producing the Wisconsin Program of the Smithsonian Folklife Festival and re-staging an expanded version of that program on the Capitol Square in Madison.

In 2001, The Arts Board received funds from the newly negotiated gaming compacts. In consultation with Wisconsin’s Tribes and Bands, the Arts Board developed the Woodland Indian Arts Initiative. In 2003, In partnership with the Center for the Study of Upper Midwestern Cultures (CSUMC), the Arts Board convened educators and folklorists at Folklore Village in Dodgeville. The result was Wisconsin Teachers of Local Culture (WTLC), a network of educators who could inspire and support each other by offering professional development opportunities focused on local culture and curricula. In 2008, the Arts Board introduced its current iteration of the Folk and Traditional Arts Apprenticeship Program, inspired by the successes of its original apprenticeship program (1985-1997). The program is designed to strengthen and encourage the continuity of Wisconsin’s diverse cultural traditions by supporting distinguished traditional artists in passing their skills and knowledge on to committed and talented apprentices from their community.

In 2011, the independent bodied Arts Board was folded into the Department of Tourism, where it retained its independent, Governor-appointed board. On March 17, 2020 the Arts Board staff transitioned to remote work in response to the global COVID-19 pandemic. Staff immediately initiated virtual listening and resource sessions in partnership with Create Wisconsin. The Arts Board funneled federal emergency funding for the arts from the NEA’s Coronavirus Aid, Relief, and Economic Security (CARES) Act grant program. In 2021, the Arts Board established the Wisconsin Arts Rescue Program (WARP).

In 2023, the Arts Board celebrated its 50th anniversary, with regional celebrations taking place throughout 2023 and 2024, in addition to a special 50th anniversary grant program, a collaboration with the Department of Public Instruction, and a celebration of 50 artists for 50 years.

== Legislative Powers and Duties ==
According to Chapter 41 Subchapter IV of the 2021-22 Wisconsin Statutes and Annotations, WAB's powers and duties are as follows:

(a) Continually study the artistic and cultural activities within the state.
(b) Assist arts activities in the state.
(c) Assist communities in creating and developing their own arts programs.
(d) Encourage and assist freedom of artistic expression.
(e) Promulgate rules, pursuant to ch. 227, for the implementation and operations of this subchapter.
(f) Plan and implement, when funds are available in the appropriations under s. 20.380 (3) (b) and (o), a program of contracts with or grants-in-aid to groups or, in appropriate cases, individuals of exceptional talent engaged in or concerned with the arts. No grantee may receive any funds distributed as grants-in-aid under this paragraph unless the grantee provides at least 50 percent of the estimated total cost of the project, either in the form of moneys or in-kind contributions of equivalent value, to be funded under this paragraph.
(fm) Conduct a program identical to that described in par. (f), but only for American Indian individuals and groups. The program shall be funded from the appropriation under s. 20.380 (3) (km).
(g) Arrange and schedule the portrait of the governor or any former governor. Costs incurred under this paragraph shall be charged to the appropriation under s. 20.380 (3) (c) up to a limit of $10,000 per portrait. Costs in excess of $10,000 per portrait may be charged to the appropriation under s. 20.380 (3) (c) only with the prior approval of the joint committee on finance.
(h) Annually, award an amount equal to at least 5 percent of all state and federal funds received by the board in that year for grants to artists and arts organizations to artists who are minority group members and arts groups composed principally of minority group members. In this paragraph, “minority group member" has the meaning specified in s. 16.287 (1) (f).
(i) Administer challenge grant programs for the purpose of encouraging the fund-raising efforts of arts organizations.
(j) Annually pay to the Milwaukee Foundation, Inc., for deposit in the High Point fund, the amount appropriated under s. 20.380 (3) (e).
(2) The board may:
(a) Enter into contracts with individuals, organizations, units of government and institutions for services furthering the development of the arts and humanities.
(am) Enter into contracts with American Indian individuals, organizations and institutions and American Indian tribal governments for services furthering the development of the arts and humanities.
(b) Accept all gifts and grants and expend them for the purposes intended.
41.53(2)(c)(c) Award an operational grant to an organization if the sum of all operational grants awarded in the current year does not exceed 50 percent of the sum of all grants awarded to organizations from the appropriations under s. 20.380 (3) (b) and (o) in the current year. In this paragraph, “operational grant" means a grant awarded by the board to support those administrative costs of an organization that are not directly related to the development of an artistic performance or product.

== Governance ==
The Arts Board is composed of an executive director and four staff members. It is governed by a fifteen-member board. Board members are Wisconsin citizens from all areas of the state and are appointed by the governor to serve a three-year term. The current chair of the board is Brian Kelsey. The Arts Board meets at least four times a year and the meetings are open to the public.

=== Arts Board Members ===
Brian Kelsey, Chairperson, Fish Creek

Lynn Richie, Vice Chairperson, Land O' Lakes

Jayne Herring, Secretary, Kenosha

Marcela "Xela" Garcia, Milwaukee

Karen Ann Hoffman, Stevens Point

John W. Johnson, Madison

Susan Lipp, Madison

Tyler Marchant, Stevens Point

Dinorah Márquez Abadiano, Milwaukee

William Mitchell, Lancaster

John H. Potter, Hudson

Jennifer Schwarzkopf, Fitchburg

Kristin Tjornehoj, Hudson

LaShawndra Vernon, Milwaukee

Matthew Wallock, Madison

=== Executive Directors ===
Executive Director	Year
Jerrold Rouby	1974-1981
Marvin Weaver	1981-1984
Patricia A. Kramer	1984-1985
Arley Curtz	1985-1991
Dean Amhaus	1991-1996
George Tzougros	1996–Present

== Funding and Granting ==
The Arts Board is funded by the state of Wisconsin and the National Endowment for the Arts. Through multiple granting programs to organizations and individuals, WAB provides grants that support community and economic development through creative expression and arts education and serve people of every culture and heritage in Wisconsin. WAB's grant programs include Creation and Presentation organizational support grants, Creative Communities project grants, Folk Arts Apprenticeship grants, Arts Challenge Initiative grants, Woodland Indian Arts Initiative grants, and Regranting grants.

Twenty years ago, Wisconsin was typical among the 50 states, investing a healthy amount of money towards arts funding. Then in 2011, the Wisconsin Arts Board's budget was cut by 67 percent, sending Wisconsin (at the time) to 48th in state support for the arts. As of 2026, Wisconsin ranks 48th in the nation in public funding on a per capita basis for the arts, with $0.20 allocated per capita, according to the National Assembly of State Arts Agencies.

== See also ==
- Arts Council
- National Endowment for the Arts
- Arts Midwest
- List of U.S. states by per capita arts funding
