= Mid Atlantic Arts Foundation =

Regional arts organization

- Abbreviation: MAA
- Established: 1979; 47 years ago
- Type: Regional Arts Organization
- Headquarters: 201 North Charles Street, Suite 401; Baltimore, Maryland 21201
- Coordinates: 39.2912445°N 76.6148051°W
- Region served: Mid-Atlantic
- Methods: Grant
- Fields: Arts
- Executive Director: Juan Souki
- Director of Programs: Nikki Kirk
- Director of Development: Brittney Huff
- Affiliations: National Endowment for the Arts
- Website: www.midatlanticarts.org

Mid Atlantic Arts, headquartered in Baltimore, Maryland, is one of six not-for-profit regional arts organizations funded by the National Endowment for the Arts (NEA). Founded in 1979, Mid Atlantic Arts works to "promote and support multi-state arts programming". The organization works in partnership with the state or territorial arts councils of Delaware, the District of Columbia, Maryland, New Jersey, New York, Pennsylvania, Puerto Rico, the US Virgin Islands, Virginia, and West Virginia. Grants cover a variety of activities including music concerts, live theatre, and arts education.
