= New England Foundation for the Arts =

- Abbreviation: NEFA
- Formation: 1976; 50 years ago
- Founded at: Boston, Massachusetts, U.S.
- Headquarters: Boston, Massachusetts, U.S.
- Region served: New England
- Website: www.nefa.org

The New England Foundation for the Arts (NEFA), headquartered in Boston, Massachusetts, is one of six not-for-profit regional arts organizations funded by the National Endowment for the Arts (NEA) and by private foundations, corporations and individuals.

Founded in 1976, NEFA functions as a grantmaker, program initiator, regional laboratory, project coordinator, developer of resources, and builder of creative partnerships among artists, arts organizations, and funders. The Foundation serves the state arts councils of Connecticut, Maine, Massachusetts, New Hampshire, Rhode Island, and Vermont, which comprise New England. NEFA also has national programs in contemporary dance and theater and administers Center Stage, an international arts exchange program in partnership with the U.S. Department of State.

== See also ==
- Culture of the United States
- Culture of New England
