= National Assembly of State Arts Agencies =

The National Assembly of State Arts Agencies (NASAA) is a non-profit membership organization for state and jurisdictional arts agencies in the United States.

== Background ==
NASAA advocates for federal funding for the arts and aims to protect that portion of the National Endowment for the Arts (NEA) grant budget that is dedicated to state arts agencies. It provides national representation for state arts agencies

NASAA monitors state arts agency trends and documents the scope and impact of state arts agency activities. NASAA collects and curates and publishes data and information on a range of topics:

=== Funding ===
- Current data on state arts agency revenues, including legislative appropriations levels, per capita funding and state rankings
- Presentations and summaries that synthesize key trends in public funding for the arts
- Information on dedicated revenue strategies that are used to supplement state arts agency budgets
- Historical data on state arts agency appropriations from 1970 to the present day.

=== Grant Making ===
- State agency grant making
- Grants to individual artists
- Support for local arts agencies
- Funding for arts education
- National Endowment for the Arts grant making.

=== State Arts Agencies ===
- Terms, powers and duties of state arts agency councils
- State arts agency staffing and compensation data
- State arts agency structure and organizational charts
- Placement of state arts agencies within state government.

=== Publications ===
NASAA publications provide information on strategic planning, needs assessment and program evaluation methods specifically adapted to public arts agencies.

== Regional arts organizations ==
The US comprises six regional arts organizations, themselves divided into 55 distinct state and territorial arts agencies. NASAA and regional organizations are peers in the national arts ecosystem, but not a hierarchy. Both collaborate with NEA and often coordinate on policy, funding initiatives, and research, but NASAA does not supervise or oversee regional organizations, which have their own governance and boards.

== See also ==
- List of U.S. states by per capita arts funding
