= Mid-America Arts Alliance =

The Mid-America Arts Alliance (M-AAA), headquartered in Kansas City, Missouri, United States is one of six not-for-profit regional arts organizations funded by the National Endowment for the Arts (NEA). Founded in 1972, M-AAA creates and manages regional, multi-regional, national, and international programs including traveling exhibitions, performing arts touring, and professional and community development. The Alliance serves the state arts councils of Arkansas, Kansas, Missouri, Nebraska, Oklahoma, and Texas.
