= Southern Arts Federation =

South Arts, formerly the Southern Arts Federation, headquartered in Atlanta, Georgia, is one of six not-for-profit regional arts organizations funded by the National Endowment for the Arts (NEA). South Arts create partnerships and collaborations, assists in the professional development of artists, arts organizations and arts professionals; presents, promotes and produces Southern arts and cultural programming; and advocates for the arts and arts education. The organization works in partnership with the nine state arts councils of Alabama, Florida, Georgia, Kentucky, Louisiana, Mississippi, North Carolina, South Carolina and Tennessee.

== History ==
Founded in 1975, South Arts is one of six not-for-profit, regional arts organizations (RAO's) funded by the National Endowment for the Arts (NEA). The NEA's House reauthorizing committee encouraged the development of RAO's in 1973 to create a more effective mechanism for delivering services, especially those related to touring and presenting the performing arts. The United States Congress sets aside a specific appropriation within the NEA budget for the "states and their regional organizations."

The legislation creating South Arts and the other Regional Arts Organizations was introduced by Public Law 93-133:

- 2/7/1973, Legislation introduced in Senate
- 4/3/1973, Reported to Senate, amended, S. Rept. 93-100.
- 5/2/1973, Passed/agreed to in Senate: Measure passed Senate, amended, roll call #112 (76-14).
- 6/14/1973, Passed/agreed to in House: Measure passed House, amended in lieu of H.R. 3926.
- 10/4/1973, Conference report agreed to in Senate: Senate agreed to conference report.
- 10/19/1973, Public law 93-133 signed by President.

South Arts is supported additionally with funding from private foundations, corporations, individuals and dues paid by member states, which include Alabama, Georgia, Florida, Kentucky, Louisiana, Mississippi, North Carolina, South Carolina, Tennessee.

== Programs ==
South Arts uses many programs in order to promote and support Arts in the South. These include:

- Folklorists in the South Retreat (FITS): Explores Tradition in a Contemporary World with a great roster of workshop and session leaders who will provide new information, resource methodology and technology tools to further research, teaching and public programs.
- Performing Arts Exchange (PAE): PAE is a 4-day conference that creates opportunities for networking and transacting business. This conference is the primary forum for professional development for artists, artist managers and presenters.
- SouthernArtistry.org: A free, online registry that showcases Southern visual and media artists, writers, performers and arts educators who have been nominated by their state arts agency based on the quality of their work.
- Podcasts: In October 2006, South Arts published its first podcast in support of its Southern Circuit program.
- Southern Circuit - Tour of Independent Filmmakers: Originated by South Carolina Arts Commission in 1975, Southern Circuit provides communities across the South with a tour of highly talented independent filmmakers.
- Southern Visions: A traveling exhibit program that showcases traditional and contemporary art throughout the Southern United States.
- Traditional Arts: South Arts identifies, promotes and presents indigenous southern arts and culture, in addition to the traditional arts of immigrant communities who make the South their home, to regional, national and international audiences.

== Partners ==
South Arts works in partnership with nine member state arts councils:

- Alabama State Council on the Arts
- Georgia Council for the Arts
- Florida Division of Cultural Affairs
- Kentucky Arts Council
- Louisiana Division for the Arts
- Mississippi Arts Commission
- North Carolina Arts Council
- South Carolina Arts Council
- Tennessee Arts Commission
