= Bill Lichtenstein =

American film producer (born 1956)

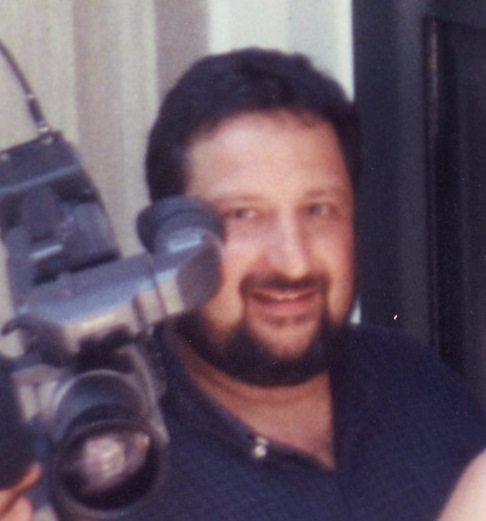
- Bill Lichtenstein during production of West 47th Street (2003)
- Born: William Theodore Lichtenstein; October 3, 1956 (age 69); Boston, Massachusetts
- Education: Brown University (B.A., Political Science and English, 1978); Columbia University Graduate School of Journalism (M.S., 1979)
- Occupations: Print and broadcast journalism; documentary producer
- Website: lcmedia.com

Bill Lichtenstein (born October 3, 1956) is an American print and broadcast journalist and documentary producer, president of the media production company, Lichtenstein Creative Media, Incorporated.

Lichtenstein began working in 1970 at age 14 as a volunteer and later as a part-time announcer and newscaster at WBCN-FM in Boston, Massachusetts. He later produced investigative reports for ABC News and public radio and television programs and documentary films on social justice issues as well as educational outreach campaigns. Lichtenstein and his company also made early use of emerging new media, including the 3-D virtual reality community Second Life.

He writes for such publications as The New York Times, The Nation, New York Daily News, Boston Globe and Huffington Post. From 1980 to 2006, Lichtenstein taught investigative reporting for TV and documentary film production at The New School in New York City.

His work has received awards including a Peabody Award; Guggenheim Fellowship; eight National Headliner Awards; CINE Golden Eagle; Casey Medal for Meritorious Journalism; and three National News Emmy Award nominations.

== Early life ==
Lichtenstein worked at WBCN (FM), one of the United States' original progressive rock radio stations starting while in junior high school, as a newscaster and on-air announcer.

He graduated from Brown University in 1978 with a degree in Political Science and English. While at Brown, Lichtenstein worked at WBRU, the 20,000-watt commercial radio station operated by Brown students, and he served as the station's program director in 1975. Lichtenstein received a M.S. degree from the Columbia University Graduate School of Journalism in 1979.

== ABC News ==
Lichtenstein began his work in television as a writer for ABC and CBS Sports, including as Chief Writer for CBS's coverage of the 1979 Pan American Games.

From 1979 through 1986, Lichtenstein reported and produced investigative reports for ABC News 20/20, Nightline, and World News Tonight. He was part of the Emmy-winning team with Sylvia Chase and Jeff Diamond that uncovered a fatal flaw in the VW Beetle, and along with Stanhope Gould, Bob Sirkin, and Steve Tello, broke the story of the Atlanta Child Murders in 1979. He collaborated with producers Lowell Bergman and Andrew Cockburn on COINTELPRO: The Secret War, the first network news report on the FBI's covert program of dirty tricks used to disrupt and neutralize political activists, including actress Jean Seberg, and Black Panther Geronimo Pratt. He worked on American Held Hostage: The Secret Negotiations, a three-hour prime time ABC News special hosted by Pierre Salinger, that chronicled the previously unreported, extensive efforts by President Jimmy Carter to gain the release of the American hostages in Iran.

In 1983, he was nominated for three national news Emmy Awards, for Throwaway Kids, a nine-month investigation into abused and children in Oklahoma state juvenile institutions,

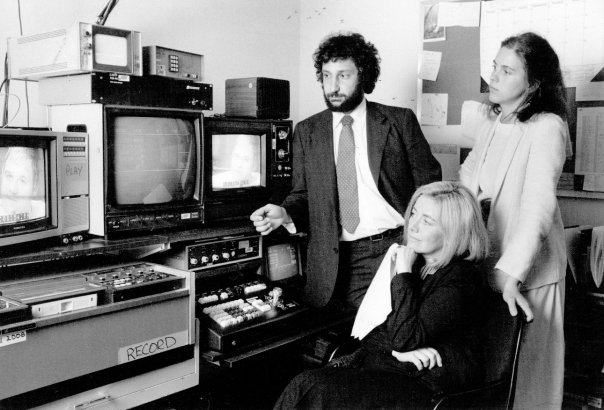
Bill Lichtenstein, producer and Sylvia Chase, correspondent, editing segment for ABC News 20/20 on mob war in Youngstown, Ohio and controversial Sheriff James Traficant, September 1, 1983.

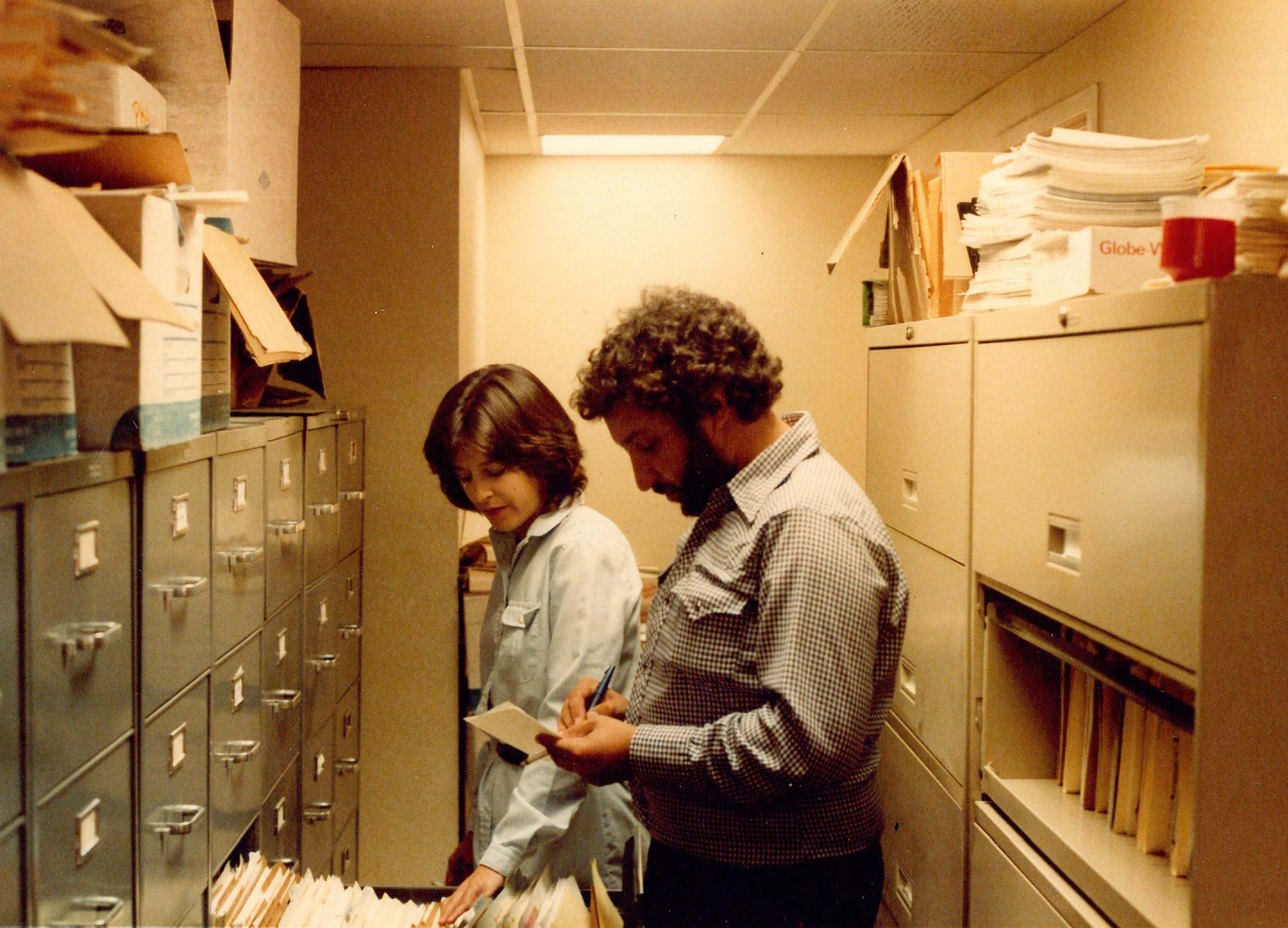
Co-producer Bill Lichtenstein, in Oklahoma, reviewing state licensing records during production of Throwaway Kids for ABC News 20/20 (1981)

A 1985 Mother Jones magazine cover story, "How ABC Spikes the News: Three Reagan Administration Scandals that Never Appeared on World News Tonight," revealed that three stories produced by Bill Lichtenstein, including investigations into Reagan administration figures Sen. Paul Laxalt, Sec. of Labor Ray Donovan and USIA director Charles Wick were killed following pressure from the Reagan White House at the same time that ABC was seeking Reagan administration support to increase the maximum number of local TV stations that any one entity could own.

The events surrounding the three reports were detailed in Mark Hertsgaard's "On Bended Knee," and "Project Censored" cited the reports as "Three Stories that Might Have Changed the Course of the 1984 Election" in their annual top ten censored stories list in 1984.

== Investigative Reporter ==
In 1986, Lichtenstein was one of the two show producers of the ABC late-night program Jimmy Breslin's People, featuring the Pulitzer Prize-winning columnist.

Lichtenstein worked in 1986 for The Investigative Group, at the law firm of Rogovin, Huge and Lenzner, then out of house council for the CIA. Headed by former Watergate counsel Terry Lenzner, Lichtenstein worked with IGI on several investigations including tracking missing royalties for the Beatles' Apple Records.

Lichtenstein reported and exposed White House efforts under President George H. W. Bush, involving staffers Bill Kristol and John Sununu, to pressure the Chairman of the National Endowment for the Arts, John Frohnmayer, to cancel four grants to controversial Karen Finley, Holly Hughes, John Fleck and Tim Miller. Lichtenstein's article in the Village Voice, "The Secret Battle for the NEA", captured third place in the National Headliner Awards for magazine coverage of a major news event. The NEA Four, as the artists became known, later sued the NEA in National Endowment for the Arts v. Finley.

== Lichtenstein Creative Media ==
Lichtenstein founded the Peabody Award-winning Lichtenstein Creative Media, Inc., in 1990. The company produced the "Voices of an Illness" documentary series, which featured people who were living with, and recovered from, serious mental illness.

Lichtenstein Creative Media produced the documentary "If I Get Out Alive", narrated by Academy Award-winning actress and youth advocate Diane Keaton, which revealed the harsh conditions and brutality faced by young people incarcerated in the adult correctional system. The program was honored with a National Headliner Award and a Casey Medal for Meritorious Journalism.

Bill Lichtenstein produced and was director of photography of the award-winning documentary film, West 47th Street, which aired on PBS' P.O.V., and was called "must see" by Newsweek. The film won the Atlanta and DC Independent Film Festivals., and an Honorable Mention at the Woodstock Film Festival.

Lichtenstein created and was senior executive producer of the national, one-hour weekly series, The Infinite Mind, which for a decade starting in 1998 was public radio's most honored and listened to health and science program. The Infinite Mind examined all aspects of neuroscience, mental health, and the mind, including "how the brain works, and why it sometimes does not from a scientific, cultural and policy perspectives,". The Infinite Mind was hosted by Dr. Fred Goodwin, the former head of the National Institute of Mental Health; Dr. Peter Kramer, author of "Listening to Prozac, and John Hockenberry, and broke ground and news on such topics as: addiction; Asperger syndrome; Alzheimer's disease; bullying; chronic fatigue syndrome; depression; mental health and immigrants; posttraumatic stress disorder; postpartum depression; and teen suicide. The national broadcast was widely hailed for its coverage of the mental health impact of the 9/11 attacks, and for providing needed resources to public radio listeners.

In addition to leading researchers and experts, The Infinite Mind included notable guests, on a wide variety of topics including John Updike (sleep); actors including Carrie Fisher (living with bipolar); comedians Richard Lewis (addiction) and Lewis Black (anger); the Firesign Theater (humor); author William Styron and his wife Rose Styron (depression); baseball batting champ Wade Boggs (sports psychology); former First Lady Rosalynn Carter (stigma); and live performances and discussions with musicians including Aimee Mann, Jessye Norman, Judy Collins, Suzanne Vega, Loudon Wainwright III, Philip Glass, and Emanuel Ax. The decade-long series received major funding from the MacArthur Foundation, the National Science Foundation, the National Institutes of Health.

Lichtenstein serves as a judge for the National News Emmy Awards, and as a screener/reviewer for the duPont Awards. He is on the advisory board of the Rosalynn Carter Fellowships for Mental Health Journalism; the National Leadership Council of the National Alliance for Research on Schizophrenia and Depression (now known as the Brain & Behavior Research Foundation); the advisory council of the Center for the Advancement of Children's Mental Health at Columbia University; review committees at the National Institutes of Health and the National Science Foundation; and advisory boards of Families for Depression Awareness and the Parents/Professionals Advocacy League.

Lichtenstein's work, and that of Lichtenstein Creative Media, has been honored with the top media awards from the major national mental health organizations, including the National Institute of Mental Health; American Psychiatric Association; National Mental Health Association; National Alliance on Mental Illness; American College of Neuropsychopharmacology; and the National Alliance for Research on Schizophrenia and Depression.

== New York Times Op-Ed ==
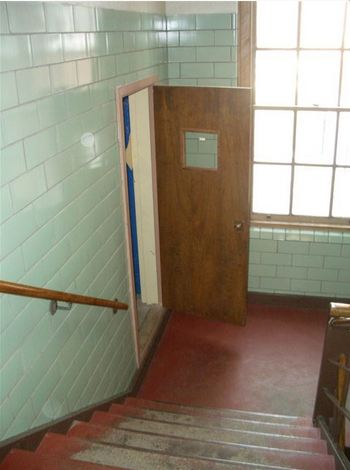
Old Harrington School, Lexington, Massachusetts isolation closet

The September 9, 2012, Sunday New York Times published an op-ed by Bill Lichtenstein entitled "A Terrifying Way to Discipline Children". that exposed the use of physical restraints and seclusion rooms in schools nationwide. Other families came forward with reports of their children also being restrained and placed in isolation rooms in Lexington, Massachusetts and across the US.

On September 16, 2012, The New York Times published an "editor's note" written by' Sewell Chan containing Lexington Public School's rebuttal to the article. Lichtenstein subsequently refuted Lexington's challenges to the story. In January 2013 the Times reported an editor and fact checker had re-reported the issues that had been raised about the article and nothing in the article was corrected or changed.

The article was honored by the 2013 Casey Medals for Meritorious Journalism and by the National Alliance on Mental Illness with its 2016 Gloria Huntley Award

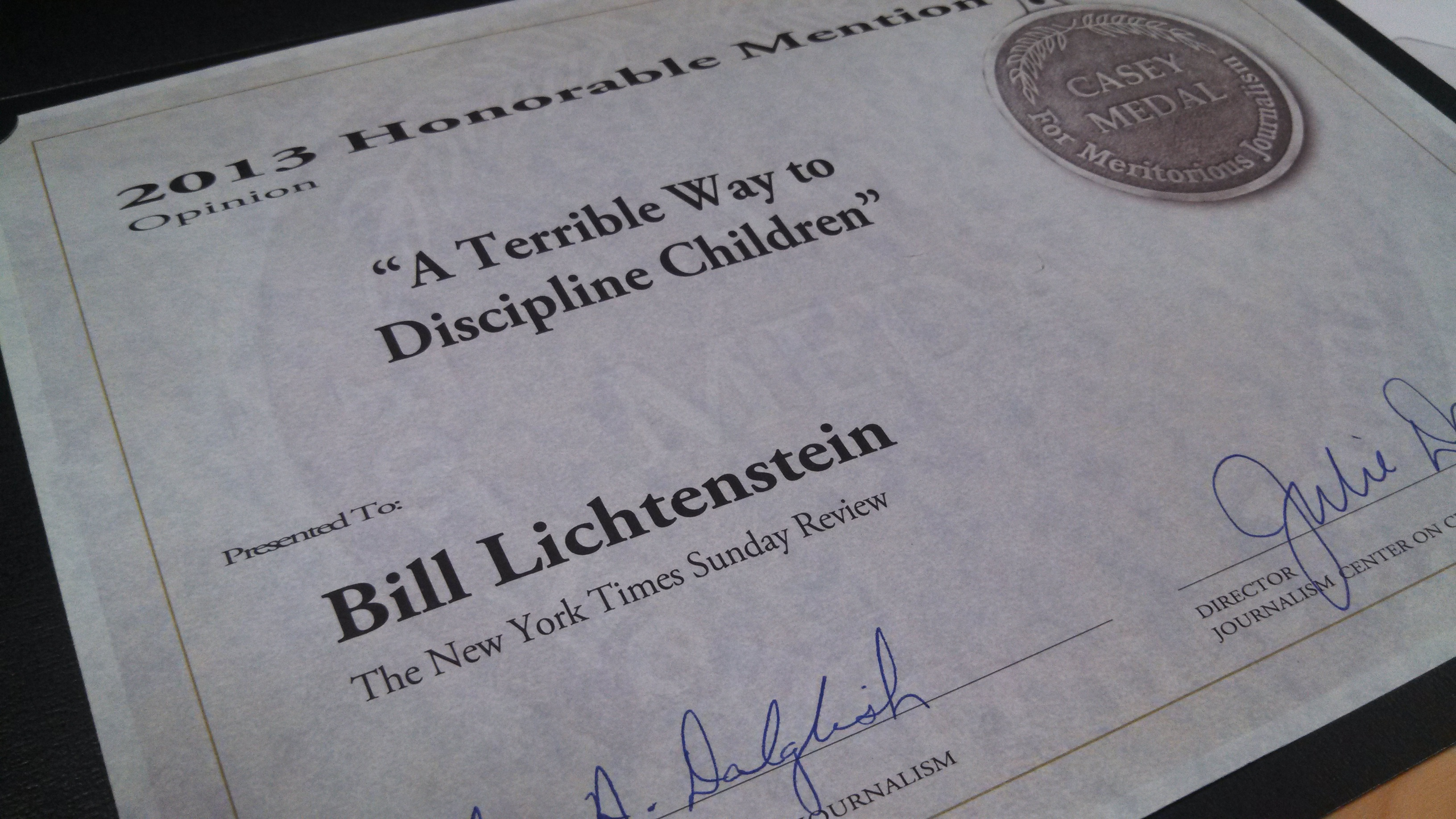
2013 Casey Medals honor for "A Terrifying Way to Discipline Children."

Lichtenstein's subsequent article, "Mass. Problems for Kids," exposed a myriad of fatal problems in the Massachusetts state child welfare system including 103 deaths of children during a 36-month period; federal investigations of Lexington Public Schools for intimidating and retaliating against parents who advocated for their children, and the details of a federal class action suit against Massachusetts Governor Deval Patrick as a result of the state's low ranking for the care and protection of children in foster care.

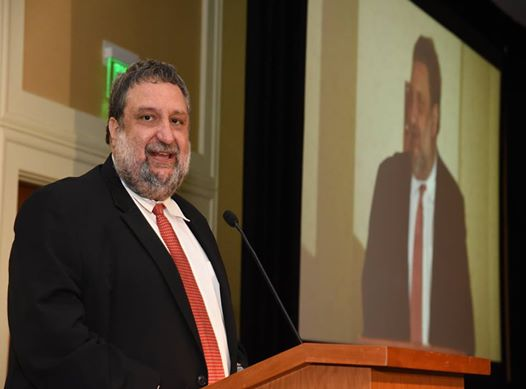
Bill Lichtenstein receives 2017 Special Recognition Award from MAMH.

On June 19, 2017, Bill was honored along with Congressman Joe Kennedy III with a Special Recognition Award from the Massachusetts Association for Mental Health for Bill's "work to educate the nation and inform public policy, combatting stigma and discrimination . . . [and for his] courage and generosity in sharing [his own] family's experience to light the path to reform and recovery for others. . . "
