= Ron Athey =

American performance artist

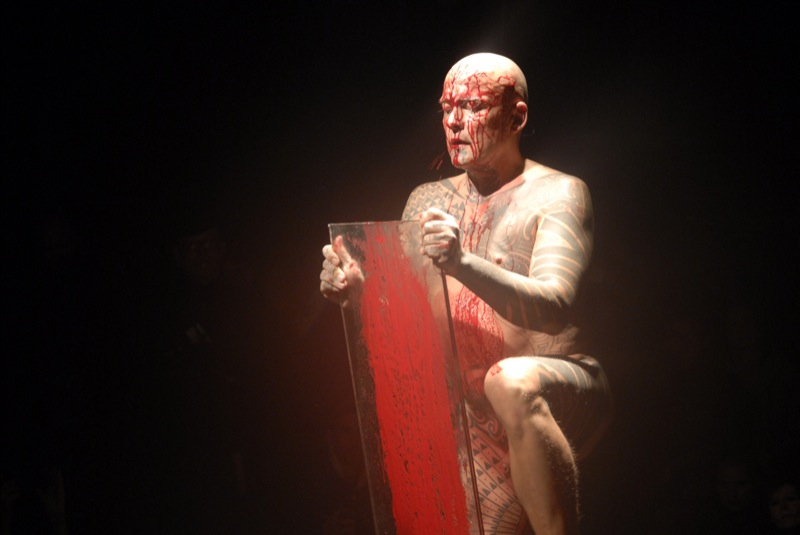
- Athey in 2007
- Born: December 16, 1961 (age 64); Groton, Connecticut, U.S.
- Known for: performance art, body art, experimental theatre, video
- Notable work: Four Scenes in a Harsh Life (1994), Deliverance (1996), Incorruptible Flesh series (1996–2013), The Solar Anus (1998), Hallelujah! Ron Athey: A Story of Deliverance (1998), Joyce (2002), Judas Cradle (2004)

Ron Athey (born December 16, 1961) is an American performance artist associated with body art and with extreme performance art and is said to be a "central figure in the development of live art." He has performed in the U.S. and internationally (especially in the UK and Europe). Athey's work explores challenging subjects like the relationships between desire, sexuality and traumatic experience. Many of his works include aspects of S&M in order to confront preconceived ideas about the body in relation to masculinity and religious iconography.

== Life and work ==
Ron Athey's earliest work dates back to collaborations with Rozz Williams during the early 1980s. Athey and Williams performed as Premature Ejaculation, staging actions in clubs and galleries and producing experimental recordings and performances for camera. Their work together was photographed by Karen Filter and published in the punk magazine No Mag in 1982. The practice for which he is most known grows from performances developed for club contexts in Los Angeles, such as Club Fuck! and Sin-a-matic. In 1992, he staged his first major ensemble performance, Martyrs & Saints. This is the first of what the artist calls his Torture Trilogy. It was followed by 4 Scenes in a Harsh Life (1993-1996) and Deliverance (1995). These works were performed in the U.S., Mexico and in Europe. In 1998, he appeared in Sex/Life in L.A. Jochen Hick's adult documentary about the sex lives of the guys who make L.A. adult movies.

His work has expanded into solo performances, collaborations, and into experimental theatre and opera. Solo performances include Solar Anus (1999), Self-Obliteration solos (2008-2011), a series of performances inspired by St. Sebastian (e.g. Sebastian Suspended, 1999; Sebastiane, 2014). His collaborative performances include the Incorruptible Flesh series, (1996-2013), commenced in collaboration with the late Chicago-based performance artist Lawrence Steger and continued in solo and collaborative installments. His most recent performances, such as Incorruptible Flesh (Messianic Remains) (2013) expand on aspects that define his earlier ensemble and collaborative work. Joyce (2002) is an experimental theatre work which uses projection and live performance to offer a portrait of the women who defined the artist's childhood. He and the artist Juliana Snapper developed Judas Cradle (2004-2005), an experimental opera. In 2010 he initiated a series of works investigating the rituals of spiritualism and Pentecostalism, Gifts of the Spirit.

Athey has a significant curatorial and programming practice. In 2000 and 2001, he collaborated with Vaginal Davis on a performance-centered queer club night, G.I.M.P. Un-Ltd. These events were staged at a bar in Silver Lake (Zen Sushi) and featured performances by Athey and Davis, as well as John Fleck, Osseus Labyrint, Los Superelegantes, and Kembra Pfahler and The Voluptuous Horror of Karen Black. In 2001 and 2002, Athey and Vaginal Davis curated an eighteen-hour performance festival as a part of Outfest, the Los Angeles Gay and Lesbian Festival. Staged under the festival's "Platinum" program, these events featured work by a range of artists, including Bruce LaBruce, Slava Mogutin, Brendan Mullen, JD Samson, Selene Luna, Mehmet Sander, and Glen Meadmore. Athey has collaborated with others (notably Lee Adams) on a curatorial project inspired by the writings of Georges Bataille, Visions of Excess (Birmingham, 2005 and 2008; Ljubljana, 2004; London, 2009). These performance programs have featured such artists such as Franko B, Julie Tolentino, Zackary Drucker, Nicole Blackman, Marisa Carnesky and Kira O'Reilly.

Through the 1990s and 2000s, Athey was a regular contributor to magazines and newspapers including Infected Faggot Perspectives, Honcho and the L.A. Weekly. Rick Castro interviewed and photographed Athey for AnotherMan UK, in November 2018. Having performed Solar Anus in the city twice in 1999, he was invited to perform twice at Mana Contemporary in Chicago via Defibrillator gallery in 2014.

Athey occasionally teaches performance (most recently, at CalArts during the 2015–2016 academic year). He currently lives in Los Angeles, California.

== Current work ==
Athey continues to stage extreme performances tied to the contemporary art community and has recently performed at REDCAT and the Institute of Contemporary Art Los Angeles.

== Influence ==
Athey is known as an activist and is said to be "at the heart of several tightly knit communities, from the SoCal goth/death rock scene in the early ’80s, to the AIDS Activism movement, and the transgressive body modification underground celebrating queer liberation.

The artist Catherine Opie, whose connections to Athey originate in Los Angeles's queer club/underground scene, photographed the artist in 1994 as a part of her Portraits series. In 1999, the Estate Project for Artists with AIDS invited Opie to produce a series of works honoring of Ron Athey's work. Opie and Athey collaborated to produce thirteen images from his performance practice, using the world's largest Polaroid camera. This series is widely exhibited, including in exhibitions exploring the relationship between photography and performance. Athey (and his former home in Silver Lake Hills) makes a notable appearance as a macabre, cross-dressing mortician in Rick Castro and Bruce LaBruce's 1996 film Hustler White. His work has also been referenced by mainstream artists. Athey was the art-director for Porno for Pyros's video for Sadness (1994, remade as A Little Sadness in 2005); including performances by Athey and his company, the video adapts images and looks from his performance Four Scenes in a Harsh Life, including the contentious Human Printing Press scene, in which Athey cuts symbols on the back of company member Divinity Fudge (aka Darryl Carlton). David Bowie appropriated (without permission) aspects of Athey's performances in the video for The Hearts Filthy Lesson (1995), in which porn performer Bud Hole stages signature piercing actions, and Bowie invoked Athey as an influence for his album 1. Outside (1995), including in the cover notes.

The first book dedicated to Athey and his work, Pleading in the Blood: The Art and Performance of Ron Athey edited by Dominic Johnson, was published in 2013 by the Live Art Development Agency and Intellect. It includes writing about his work by major artists including Guillermo Gómez-Peña, Anohni, Robert Wilson, Lydia Lunch and Bruce LaBruce, and essays by scholars such as Amelia Jones, Jennifer Doyle, Adrian Heathfield, Homi K. Bhabha and others.

== NEA controversy ==
In 1994 Athey became a figure in a culture war, as conservative politicians fought to bar artwork with visible gay and feminist content from receiving public funding. Controversy regarding the nature of his work was part of a series of battles regarding work by gay artists—such as a lawsuit filed by the NEA Four (Karen Finley, Holly Hughes, Tim Miller and John Fleck), and legal battles around the exhibition of work of Robert Mapplethorpe, David Wojnarowicz, Andres Serrano and Joel-Peter Witkin. Excerpts from Four Scenes in a Harsh Life were staged at Patrick's Cabaret in Minneapolis on March 5, 1994, with support from the Walker Art Center. The Walker's Performing Arts Director, John Killacky remembers that "the sold-out performance was well received by an audience of about one hundred. Post-show discussions with the artist, attended by 80 people, were thoughtful and engaging. Theatre and dance critics had been invited, none chose to attend." During one scene in this performance, Athey made light cuts in co-performer Darryl Carlton's (stage name Divinity Fudge) back, placed strips of absorbent paper towel on the cuts and then, using a pulley, hoisted the blood-stained cloths into the air. Local art critic/reporter Mary Abbe (who had not witnessed the performance) wrote a news account of complaints concerning the performance; this story appeared on the front page of the Minneapolis Star-Tribune. The report quoted the Walker's director Kathy Halbreich and performing arts director John Killacky, audience members, and Minnesota state health officials. The supervisor of the AIDS epidemiology unit in Minnesota's state health department said that "it did not appear that audience members were endangered." That story was picked up by the Associated Press and quickly made national headlines. The then-widespread anxiety about AIDS combined with a shocked reaction from those unfamiliar with S&M-related art: some critics and lawmakers, including Jesse Helms, falsely described his performances as exposing audience members to HIV-infected blood.

Although this 1994 performance was supported only indirectly (via the Walker Center) by $150 from the National Endowment for the Arts, Athey's name was frequently invoked in criticism of the NEA. Athey was not alone in this: performance artists Tim Miller, John Fleck, Karen Finley and Holly Hughes would later become the NEA Four as they fought a case regarding funding for their work before the Supreme Court. Unlike these other artists, Athey has never applied for federal funds to support his work. Nevertheless, the controversy over this incident shaped public perception of his work. In a 2015 Artist Op-Ed for the Walker Art Center, the artist writes that he was "more or less blacklisted" from U.S. arts venues until 2005, when he and Snapper staged Judas Cradle at REDCAT in Los Angeles. His 2014 performance of Sebastiane at the Hammer Museum in Los Angeles was his first performance inside an American museum.
