= Karen Finley =

American performance artist

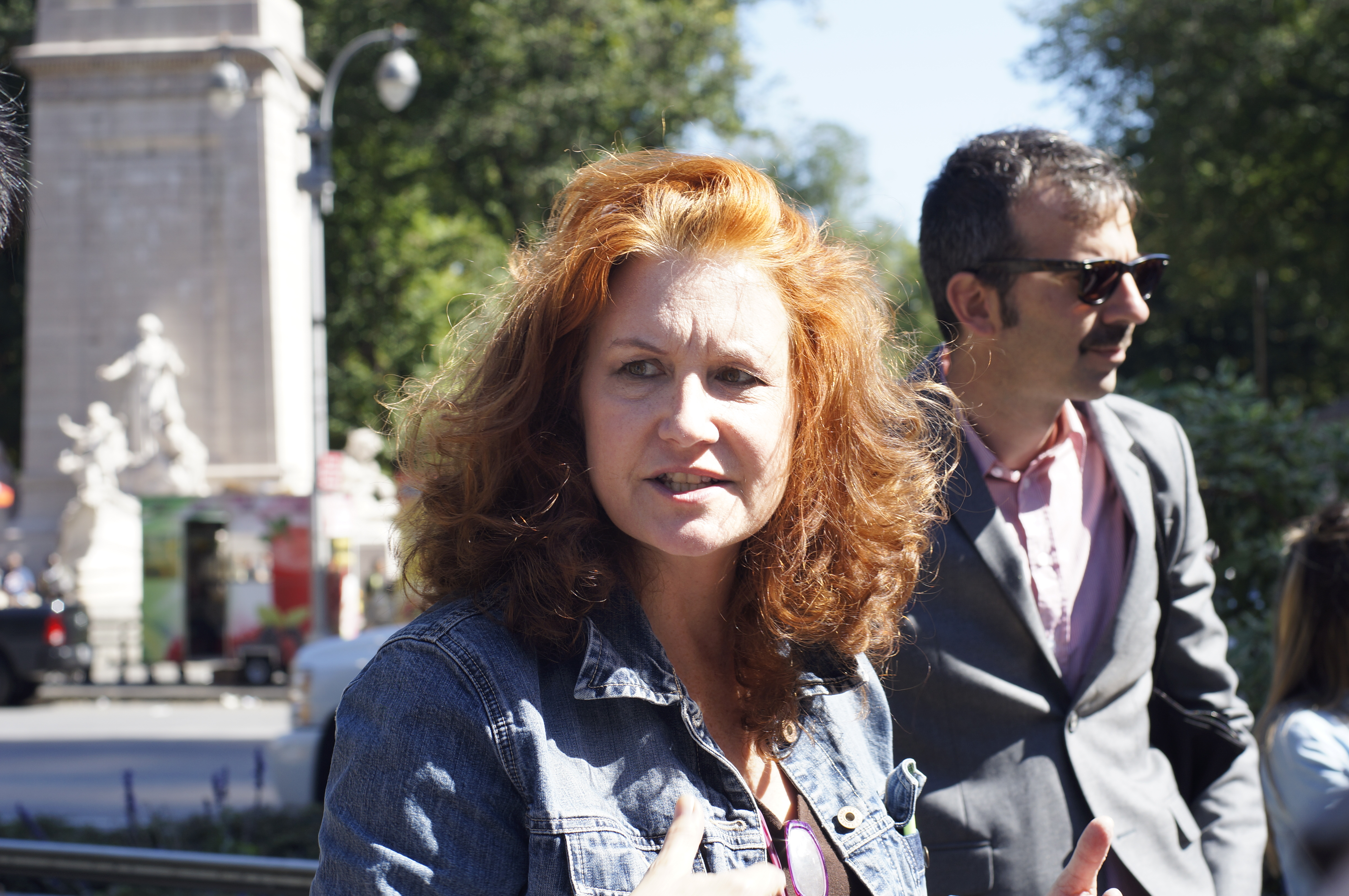
- Finley in 2014
- Born: 1956 (age 69–70); Chicago, Illinois
- Education: San Francisco Art Institute
- Occupations: Performance artist, musician, poet, educator
- Employer: NYU Tisch School of the Arts
- Known for: Performance art
- Spouse: Brian Routh (m. 1981; div. 1987)

Karen Finley (born 1956) is an American performance artist, visual artist, musician, poet, and educator.

Her performance and visual art, recordings, and books are used as forms of activism. She has employed nudity and profanity in her work. Finley incorporates depictions of sexuality, abuse, and disenfranchisement in her work. She is a professor at the Tisch School of the Arts at New York University.

Karen Finley has written various books that focus on controversial topics. Her most recent books include Grabbing Pussy (OR Books, 2018), based on her widely praised performance piece Unicorn Gratitude Mystery, and COVID Vortex Anxiety Opera Kitty Kaleidoscope Disco (City Lights, 2025), a meditation on the extraordinary time of loss, isolation, and bizarre rituals of the Covid era and its aftermath. She wrote Shock Treatment, Enough Is Enough: Weekly Meditations for Living Dysfunctionally, the Martha Stewart satire Living It Up: Humorous Adventures in Hyperdomesticity, Pooh Unplugged (detailing the eating and psychological disorders of Winnie the Pooh and his friends), and A Different Kind of Intimacy - a later collection of her works. Her poem "The Black Sheep" is among her best-known works; it was displayed as public art in New York City for one month. Finley's poetry is included in The Outlaw Bible of American Poetry.

She was notably one of the NEA Four, as a party to the legal case National Endowment for the Arts v. Finley (1998), which argued before the U.S. Supreme Court that it was unconstitutional to award art grants on the basis of community decency standards. The four performance artists, whose grants from the National Endowment for the Arts were vetoed in 1990 by John Frohnmayer after the process was condemned by Senator Jesse Helms under "decency" issues, were Finley, Holly Hughes, Tim Miller, and John Fleck. The case was decided against Finley and the other artists.

== Biography ==
Finley was born in Chicago and raised in Evanston, Illinois. She is a relative of the American humorist and writer Finley Peter Dunne. She describes her father George Finley as being of Irish and Scottish descent and her mother Mary as "part gypsy" and "also part American Indian and Jewish". She has said that her mother was "taken as brown" during her life and experienced racism.

While Karen Finley was a student at the San Francisco Art Institute, she became immersed in the Bay Area's punk music scene, witnessing the emergence of the bands The Dils and the Dead Kennedys. In 1977, Finley performed in underground art galleries and music clubs such as Mabuhay Gardens and Club Foot, which hosted poetry readings, punk concerts, and alternative performance art acts. Finley's performance Deathcakes and Autism included a dancer, called "Laurie", from the Condor Club. The work's narrative juxtaposes the shattering psychological impact of Finley's father's recent suicide with a study of the female nude. Having received an MFA in 1982 from the San Francisco Art Institute, Finley procured her first NEA grant and moved to New York City. She quickly became part of the city's art scene, collaborating with artists such as The Kipper Kids (Brian Routh — whom she married/divorced — and Martin von Haselberg) and David Wojnarowicz.

Finley's early recordings featured her ranting provocative monologues over disco beats (and she would often perform her songs late night at Danceteria, where she worked). These recordings include the singles "Tales of Taboo" from 1986 and "Lick It" from 1988 (both produced by Madonna collaborator Mark Kamins) plus the 1988 album The Truth Is Hard to Swallow. She collaborated with Sinéad O'Connor on a remix of O'Connor's song "Jump in the River", and was prominently sampled by S'Express on the classic dance floor cut-up, "Theme from S-Express" (her vocal - sampled from "Tales of Taboo" - exclaimed, "Drop that ghettoblaster!").

In 1988, Finley appeared in the film Mondo New York, a pseudo-documentary featuring performances of New York’s underground performance stars such as Karen Finley, Joey Arias, Lydia Lunch, Ann Magnuson, John Sex, Phoebe Legere, Dean Johnson, and many more.

In 1991, she created the Memento Mori installation in Newcastle upon Tyne, as part of the Burning the Flag? festival examining American live art and censorship. Finley also played Tom Hanks' character's doctor in the movie Philadelphia at the invitation of director Jonathan Demme. In 1993, Finley was awarded a Guggenheim Fellowship for Fine Arts.

In 1992, The Kitchen in New York City presented Lamb of God Hotel, a play written and directed by Karen Finley and starring Helen Schumacher, Hapi Phace, Andy Soma, and Amy Elliot. The dark comedy explored themes of personal suffering, social ostracism, sexual abuse, and AIDS politics in a biting series of surreal, humorous, and unsettling scenes set within a rundown SRO hotel.

In 1994, her album The Truth Is Hard to Swallow was re-released on CD, with a slightly different track listing, as Fear of Living. In conjunction with the re-release, both "Tales of Taboo" and "Lick It" appeared on 12-inch again with new remixes by Super DJ Dmitry, Junior Vasquez, and other DJs of note. Samples of vocal from "Tales of Taboo" were used by French DJs in a dance song "Suck My Pussy", which was a minor hit in France. Finley released a double-disc set on the Rykodisc label, A Certain Level of Denial, a studio version of the performance piece. Following that piece came The Return of the Chocolate-smeared Woman, her performance rebuttal to Helms and the NEA controversy. The U.S. Congress imposed restrictions on grants for indecent art. NEA head John Frohnmayer took the side of the targeted artists, which included Finley. The case, National Endowment for the Arts v. Finley (1998), argued in front of the U.S. Supreme Court, was decided against Finley and the other artists, known as the NEA Four.

Finley has expressed delight at the fact that she appeared in Playboy (in July 1999) and received a Ms. magazine Woman of the Year award within months of each other. She was also featured in Time during this period, though she felt that the magazine misrepresented her by "eroticizing" works (such as one that addressed rape) based on her nudity alone; in other words, that they could not absorb any information beyond her naked body. After the attacks of 9/11, Finley found it difficult to appear as herself on stage. It was almost as if "Karen Finley" got in the way of the material, and Finley had already found herself at the center of a firestorm that made her persona a controversial national reference to nudity in art, in a public conversation that extended from The Oprah Winfrey Show to David Mamet to Seinfeld to Rush Limbaugh to David Letterman to Dennis Miller (she was famously edited out of a Miller show at mid-show) to Sean Hannity to Bill Maher to Rent, the Broadway musical, where the character of Maureen is often described as an homage to Finley. In her performances, Finley's voice now became the voice of other women that she embodied; Liza Minnelli, Terry Schaivo, Laura Bush, Silda Spitzer, and Jackie Kennedy Onassis. Finley also wrote a play, George and Martha, depicting a fictional affair between Martha Stewart and George W. Bush; the play has its roots in other versions of George and Martha, notably that of Edward Albee.

The Karen Finley Live DVD (2004) compiled performances of Shut Up and Love Me and Make Love. Finley revived a slightly updated version of "Make Love" at The Cutting Room in New York to commemorate the seventh anniversary of 9/11; she marked the tenth anniversary of 9/11 with a performance of "Make Love" at the Laurie Beechman Theatre in Times Square. In 2009, Finley created a memorial at the concentration camp in Gusen, Austria to commemorate the murder by lethal injection to the heart of 420 Jewish children by the Nazis in February 1945. The installation, Open Heart, was created with Austrian school children and Holocaust survivors. In 2011, she lectured at the Museum of Modern Art in New York about music and art, reflecting on her inclusion in the MoMA exhibition Music 3.0 of her composition "Tales of Taboo". She published a compendium of her work from 2001 to 2010 through The Feminist Press at CUNY. In 2011, she was especially honored to read from her 10-year retrospective, The Reality Shows at City Lights Bookstore there, the publisher of her first book Shock Treatment. In 2015, City Lights Books released a commemorative 25th Anniversary edition of Shock Treatment with an extended introduction. In 2012, Finley was a Fellow at Kelly Writers House at the University of Pennsylvania where she introduced a new work, Broken Negative Catch 23, a deeply personal reflection of her performance We Keep Our Victims Ready that had ignited the NEA controversy 23 years before. Broken Negative Catch 23 was performed at the Carpenter Performing Arts Center at California State University, Long Beach in September 2012, as part of a reunion of the NEA Four; Finley's performance and re-performance included NEA Four colleague John Fleck and artist Bruce Yonemoto.

In 2013, the New Museum in New York City presented Karen Finley's Sext Me If You Can, a highly personal performance that took place in the public lobby of the museum. The exhibit, which blurred the lines between art, commerce, popular culture, private behavior, taboos and sexuality, allowed patrons to purchase a drawing that Finley created of a photographic image that they "sexted" to Finley from a private room in the museum. The resulting paintings were on display in the museum's windows, and then went home as the property of the patron. In the summer of 2014, Finley led group meetings on Friday evenings at the Museum of Arts and Design at Columbus Circle in New York City of Artists Anonymous, designed after 12-step self-help programs. Finley's 13-step program encourages personal exploration from artists whose "lives have become unmanageable because of art".

Finley developed a new performance based on her early writing about AIDS from the 1980s and 1990s. In 2013, Finley responded to a request to participate in a New York gallery exhibition looking back at the past 25 years of the AIDS epidemic, NOT OVER: 25 Years of Visual AIDS, to which Finley responded by installing an abbreviated homage to her early installation, Written in Sand, originally presented at Hallwalls in Buffalo. This led to Finley reading some of her early AIDS writing at Participant Gallery in the summer of 2013 at a tribute to the late artist Gordon Kurtti. By fall 2013, the performance Written in Sand was launched from these beginnings. In the work Finley recited 12 poems about AIDS from her own books Shock Treatment, A Different Kind of Intimacy and elsewhere. Written in Sand was performed at University at Buffalo, at Colby College, at Kelly Writers House at the University of Pennsylvania and, in October 2014, over a month-long run at the Baruch Performing Arts Center in New York City in collaboration with multi-instrumentalist Paul Nebenzahl. Written In Sand was performed again as the headline performance of the Spill Festival at London' Barbican Center in October 2015; Finley also installed Ribbon Gate at Spill 2015 as a participatory AIDS memorial for Londoners.

In 2016, Finley introduced "Unicorn Gratitude Mystery" at New York City's Laurie Beechman Theater on 42nd Street. In this performance, she satirizes both Donald Trump and Hillary Clinton. In 2017, Finley appeared as the lead actor in director Bruce Yonemoto's film, Far East of Eden, which explores institutional and state racism in 1910s California through the lens of racist Senator James Duval Phelan. The film is narrated by George Takei.

== Influences ==
Finley's work was influenced by her professors at the San Francisco Art Institute, Linda Montano and Howard Fried and pioneer performance artist Carolee Schneemann. She was also influenced by jazz artists such as Billie Holiday and the beat poets of San Francisco, such as Gregory Corso and Allen Ginsberg.

== Books ==
- 1990: Shock Treatment
- 1993: Enough Is Enough: Weekly Meditations for Living Dysfunctionaly
- 1996: Living it Up: Humorous Adventures in Hyperdomesticity
- 1999: Pooh Unplugged
- 2000: A Different Kind of Intimacy: The Collected Writings of Karen Finley
- 2006: George and Martha
- 2011: The Reality Shows
- 2015: City Lights Books - Shock Treatment: Expanded 25th Anniversary Edition
- 2018: Grabbing Pussy
- 2025: City Lights Books - Covid Vortex Anxiety Opera Kitty Kaleidoscope Disco

== Discography ==
=== Albums ===
- 1987: The Truth Is Hard to Swallow
- 1994: Fear of Living
- 1994: A Certain Level of Denial

=== Singles ===
- 1986: "Tales of Taboo"
- 1988: "Lick It!"
- 1988: "Jump in the River" (with Sinéad O'Connor)

== Filmography ==
Year	Title	Role	Notes
1985	You Killed Me First	Mom	
1988	Mondo New York	Herself	
1993	The Genius	Kitty Church	
1993	Philadelphia	Dr. Gillman	
1994	Fresh Kill		

== See also ==
- NEA Four
- National Endowment for the Arts v. Finley
- "Suck My Pussy"
