= Frank Hodsoll =

American art historian

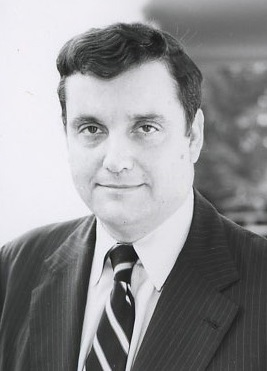
- 1981

4th Chairman of the National Endowment for the Arts
- In office 1981–1989
- President: Ronald Reagan
- Preceded by: Livingston L. Biddle, Jr.
- Succeeded by: John Frohnmayer

Personal details
- Born: Francis Samuel Monaise Hodsoll; May 1, 1938 Los Angeles, California, U.S.
- Died: July 24, 2016 (aged 78) Falls Church, Virginia, U.S.
- Education: Yale University (BA); St Catharine's College, Cambridge (MA, LLB); Stanford University (JD)

Francis Samuel Monaise "Frank" Hodsoll (May 1, 1938 – July 24, 2016) was an American historian. He was the fourth chairman of the National Endowment for the Arts. He was appointed by President Ronald Reagan and served from 1981 to 1989.

Hodsoll was principal of Hodsoll & Associates, consultants on Federal policy and management, and a Fellow of the National Academy of Public Administration. He advised the Brademas Center for the Study of Congress on international cultural engagement. He also served on the 2011 UNESCO World Press Freedom Day steering committee, and is currently engaged with the planning of the 40th anniversary of the World Heritage Program in 2012.

Hodsoll recently cochaired the International Cultural Engagement Task Force of the November 2010 U.S. Summit for Global Citizen Diplomacy (principal author of the Task Force’s report and video of selected best practices). He had previously chaired the Culture and World Heritage committees of the U.S. National Commission for UNESCO; and was a senior adviser to the President’s Committee on the Arts and the Humanities (PCAH) on international projects involving film, television, and digital media.

Hodsoll chaired the National Endowment for the Arts (1981–89). He is credited with President Reagan’s initiation of the PCAH and legislation to create the National Medal of Arts. He initiated the Jazz Masters and National Heritage fellowships, and the Mayors Institute on City Design. He established a new school-based arts education program, published the landmark report Toward Civilization, and began the process that led to national standards. NEA leadership grants during this period included start-up support for the Sundance Institute and the American Masters series on Public Television. He won an Oscar and Special Emmy for his work in film and television preservation.

Hodsoll was the first deputy director for management of the Office of Management & Budget in the executive office of the president. His federal career had included assignments in the White House (deputy assistant to President Reagan), State Department, Commerce Department, and Environmental Protection Agency. He was a foreign service officer 1966-1980, with his last job there as deputy U.S. special representative for non-proliferation.

Following his federal service, Hodsoll founded a nationally recognized mapping and data service in western Colorado, was elected a county commissioner, and served as vice chair of the National Association of Counties telecommunications committee. He has cochaired three American assemblies: the Arts and the Public Purpose, Deals and Ideals: For-Profit and Not-for-Profit Arts Connections, and Art, Technology, and Intellectual Property.

Hodsoll has a B.A. from Yale, an M.A. and LL.B from St Catharine's College, Cambridge, and a J.D. from Stanford. Early in his career, he ran a trading company in the Philippines and practiced law in New York (Sullivan & Cromwell). He married Mimi McEwen, an artist, had two children and two grandchildren, and lived in Falls Church, Virginia.

Hodsoll died on July 24, 2016, in Falls Church, Virginia, from cancer. He was 78.
