= John Fleck =

John Fleck may refer to:

- John Fleck (actor) (born 1951), American actor
- John Fleck (footballer) (born 1991), Scottish footballer
