= Defibrillator gallery =

Roving performance platform in Chicago, United States

Defibrillator gallery (styled DFBRL8R) is a roving performance platform in Chicago, United States, founded and directed by American performance artist Joseph Ravens. It started as a physical space in 2010, at 1136 North Milwaukee in Noble Square until it lost its lease in 2014 due to the unconventional nature of the work it supported. DFBRL8R moved to 1463 W. Chicago Avenue in 2015 and was based there until about 2018 when the gallery was invited to move to the Zhou B. Art Center at 1029 W. 35th Street. The gallery has hosted Ron Athey, Marilyn Arsem, Regina José Galindo, and Austrian performance artist Veronika Merklein, among others.

The performance gallery opened in December 2010 with a work by Estonian group Non Grata. It gave space to the Rapid Pulse performance art festival which ran from 2012 to 2016. Presenters in that festival included Chinese-Canadian Chun Hua Catherine Dong and Americans Esther Neff and Ayana Evans. Matt Morris of Newcity described DFBRL8R as "a rare breed of art space that champions work being made between the genres of visual art, theater and dance."
