= Dublin Live Art Festival =

Annual live performance event in Ireland

The Dublin Live Art Festival is an annual event, created in order to support and promote live Performance Art in Ireland.

== History ==
The Dublin Live Art Festival was founded in 2012 and is curated by live performance artist Niamh Murphy. The aim of the festival is to "build on the thriving live art community working in Ireland today, while also making connections with international live art makers". The first Dublin Live Art Festival took place in 2012 with its inaugural festival event, with further varied live performance art events and exhibitions taking place as part of Dublin Live Art Festival annually since.

Murphy is known for her collaborative and curatorial practice that forges links between live art practitioners and gives visibility to Irish Live Art. The concept and impetuous of the event developed from Murphy's previous curation Straylight, for Darklight Film Festival in 2008 & 2009. This led to the establishment of Performance Art Live (P.A. Live) with Amanda Coogan The manifesto of P.A. Live outlines performance art in Ireland as perhaps developing from an enthusiasm for the live that can be traced to social traditions of sport, music and storytelling and Ireland's history of uprising.

In 2010 P.A. Live presented Right Here Right Now at Kilmainham Gaol which was viewed as a watershed exhibition in the calendar of events of Irish Visual arts. It featured some of Ireland's top contemporary artists working within the realm of performance art, north and south of the Border and focused on artists who have live performance as the central tenet of their practice and who work as artist-performers in duration. Right Here Right Now was distinctive, providing an in-depth focus on live performance art. Visitors to this free event experienced twenty live artists, performing simultaneously over a four-hour period throughout the cells and open areas of Kilmainham Gaol's East Wing. The artists who performed on the night were, Aine Phillips, Amanda Coogan, Brian Connolly, Dominic Thorpe, Frances Mezzetti, Brian Patterson, Sinead McCann, Catherine Barragry, Fergus Byrne, Michelle Browne, Ann Maria Healy, Francis Fay, Pauline Cummins, Victoria Mc Cormack, Alex Conway, Helena Walsh, Sandra Johnston, Meabh Redmond, Niamh Murphy and Alastair Mac Lennan.

== Ethos ==
The festival principles stated that it:

- recognises and celebrates the huge surge in interest and production of live performance art in Ireland and abroad today.
- invests in the future and sustainability of Irish live performance art by uniting artists and curators to produce new work for new audiences.
- believes that sharing skills, knowledge and experience through our seminar series serves to strengthen our live performance art community.
- maintains a cross-disciplinary approach to forge links between the many different facets of live performance art.
- invites overseas artists to make work in Ireland and build relationships with Irish artists and venues with a view to opening up possibilities for artistic exchange.

Dublin Live Art Festival (DLAF) features curated events, seminars and workshops on live art and performance. DLAF features both established and emerging artists, from Ireland and Internationally. It has featured curated events by Irish performance initiatives such as Livestock, Performance Art Network, Performance Art Live (P.A. Live) and Unit 1 as well as international groups Der Pfeil, Mobius and Northern Uproar.

Supporting its aim to develop live art practices in Ireland, DLAF has featured workshops led by James King, Liz Aggiss, Áine Phillips El Putnam, Harold Offeh and a masterclass with Nigel Rolfe.

The festival also features seminars such as Sustaining Performance based Practices in 2013. In her article Sustaining the Ephemeral El Putnum notes debates arising such as those around performance as a potentially lone practitioners and the need for collectivity. Such debates underscore the aim and relevance of the festival to support the practices of Live Artists in Ireland.

== 2012 featured artists ==
- Snap it like a Diva Workshop with Harold Offeh and Steve Nice
- Redmond/ Murphy

=== Livestock ===
- Francis Fay
- Katherine Nolan
- Eleanor Lawler
- Alan Delmar

=== Performance Art Network ===
- Alex Conway
- Frances Mezzetti
- Brian Patterson

=== Unit 1 ===
- Michelle Brown
- Sally O'Dowd
- Hilary Williams

=== DLAF12 video strand ===
- Mitch Conlon
- Ruth Flynn
- Fiona O'Reilly,
- Frances Williams/Anna Spearman
- Vanessa Dawes
- Julieann O'Malley
- Áine Belton
- David Nugents
- Dominic Thorpe

== 2013 featured artists ==
- Liz Aggiss
- Nigel Rolfe
- Weeks and Whitford
- Aine Phillips

=== Live Stock ===
- Francis Fay
- Eleanor Lawler
- darren caffery
- Fathers of Western Thought
- Patricia Melo
- Gearoid O'Dea
- Alan Delmar

=== I give you utopias ===
Curated by Aine Phillips

- Aine Phillips
- Hillary Gilligan (in collaboration with Marolly Rowan)
- Noel Arrigan
- John Freeman (in collaboration with Elizabeth Matthews)

=== Unit 1 ===
- Michelle Brown
- Brian Connolly
- James King

== 2014 featured artists ==
The Dublin Live Art Festival 2014 took place in The MART Firestation, Rathmines and on the streets of Dublin (including The Art Lot, Collins Barracks and Stoneybatter) during the 25th to 28 September 2014.

International curator Jonas Stampe was our DLAF14 special guest

=== Der Pfeil ===
- Ida Grimsgaard (Oslo, Norway)
- Kirsten Heshusius (Amsterdam, the Netherlands)
- Marcel Sparmann (Berlin, Germany)
- Zoé Blanc (Zurich, Switzerland)
- Björn Neukom (Zurich, Switzerland)

=== Livestock ===
- Ciarán O'Keefe
- Patricia Melo
- Conor O'Grady
- Fathers of Western Thought
- Sally O'Dowd
- Áine O'Hara
- David J Magee
- Terry Erraught
- Dr. Katherine Nolan
- Catherine Barragry
- Leona Cully (Writing)

=== Northern Uproar ===
- Rob Ireson
- Rob Hilken
- Charlotte Bosanquet

=== What's the Body For? ===
Curated by Katherine Nolan

- Eleanor Lawler
- Seamus Bradley
- Tanya O'Keefe
- Debbie Guinnane
- Sandy Huckleberry (USA)
- Jeff Huckleberry (USA)
- Olivia Hassett
- Lili Spain (UK)
- EL Putnam (USA)

=== StreetLive ===
- Siobh Mc Grane and Chun Hua Catherine Dong (Canada)
- Eleanor Lawler and Ane Sagatun (Norway)
- Katherine Nolan and Lili Spain (UK)
- Catherine Barragry and Bjorn Neukom (Switzerland)

=== Art Lot ===
- Eleanor Lawler
- Rob McGlade (Fathers of Western Thought)
- Francis Fay
- Niamh Murphy
- Aine O'Hara
- Chun Hua Catherine Dong
- Liadain Herriott
- Aine Phillips
- Participants of Mistress Workshop by Aine Phillips
- Aine Phillips
- Katherine Nolan
