= NEA Four =

Performance artists denied grants (1990)

The "NEA Four", Karen Finley, Tim Miller, John Fleck, and Holly Hughes, were performance artists whose proposed grants from the United States government's National Endowment for the Arts (NEA) were vetoed by John Frohnmayer in June 1990. Grants were overtly vetoed on the basis of subject matter after the artists had successfully passed through a peer review process. John Fleck was vetoed for a performance comedy with a toilet prop.

The artists won their case in court in 1993 and were awarded amounts equal to the grant money in question. However, the case would make its way to the United States Supreme Court in National Endowment for the Arts v. Finley, which ruled in favor of the NEA's decision making process.

In response, the NEA, under pressure from Congress, stopped funding individual artists.

== Lead up to the controversy ==
=== Peer review process within the NEA ===
The NEA has used peer review panels since 1966 (one year after its inception). The NEA's Founding Chairperson Roger L. Stevens did not want to use panels, preferring that staff members review applications. Due to the increase of funds and applications, Stevens turned to peer review panels. Nancy Hanks (the next chairperson appointed by President Richard M. Nixon in 1969) expanded panels and created a list of three criteria: appointments must be merit-based; appointees must serve the panel as individuals, and may not make decisions based on any particular interest group, institution or viewpoint; the panels must be insulated from external pressures. The last criterion became more difficult to enforce as the budget of the NEA grew, and public interest in how the money was spent mounted.

In 1979, Report: a Study of the Panel System at the National Endowment for the Arts recommended that the panels be split into a policy panel that reviewed policies within the NEA panel process and a review panel that only made granting decisions. Once adopted this split panel allowed for more review panelists to be engaged who represented more diverse art practices. Also in 1979, a House report found that the NEA was failing to establish a coherent system of review and had not established a uniform system of review.

=== The NEA and President Ronald Reagan ===
Ronald Reagan began his presidency in 1981 and by the end of his two terms in office in 1989 the NEA's funding had dropped by 50% based on inflation. After his election in 1980 the New York Times ran an article by Hilton Kramer stating that Reagan arts policy advisors believed that both the NEA and the National Endowment for the Humanities had strayed from their original intent, and that their standards of artistry had been lowered to an unacceptable level. Kramer stated that there were opposing views within the group of Reagan's policy makers on how to deal with the perceived issues of the two Endowments. One solution offered was the adoption of narrower programs and renewing an emphasis on high art and scholarly practice, the other solution reported by Kramer was the abolishment of the Endowments entirely. Kramer's reportage was subsequently corroborated by Livingston L. Biddle, Jr. the third NEA chairman in his 1988 book Our Government and the Arts (American Council for the Arts, 1988).

In 1981 President Reagan convened a Special Presidential Task Force on the Arts and Humanities to assess the endowment process and its policies for awarding federal funds for culture. The task force reported that the agencies were basically sound and in need of only minor improvements. The task force also supported the peer review process as fair and able to act effectively. Despite this finding, pressure to decentralize NEA funding – funneling it through state and local agencies – mounted during the 80s and into the 90s from both conservative and liberal interest groups. In June 1985 Representative Steve Bartlett (R-Texas) proposed an amendment to a 1986 appropriations bill that would not allow the NEA to fund artwork considered to be "patently offensive to the average person". The amendment was struck down but laid the groundwork for future debate on what makes an artwork obscene. In October 1985 the United States House of Representatives passed two amendments to the budget that limited the NEA to funding artistic work with "significant literary, scholarly, cultural or artistic merit" and requiring that recipients file financial reports within 90 days of the end of their grant period. The NEA was also pressured to rely on formulas for arts assessment. Frank Hodsoll (chairperson from 1981 to 1989) and John Frohnmayer (chairperson from 1989 to 1992 during the heart of the NEA Four controversy) both had to fight such political pressure to retain the peer review model as well as their own roles within the NEA.

=== Additional events ===
In 1989 two art pieces drew controversy to the NEA, Andres Serrano's Piss Christ and Robert Mapplethorpe's The Perfect Moment (which was canceled at The Corcoran Gallery of Art in Washington, DC due to political pressure). The controversy around these two art pieces led to increased interest in how the NEA was spending its money from conservative lawmakers.

In June 1989, prompted by Andres Serrano's Piss Christ, Senators Alfonse D'Amato and Jesse Helms, joined by twenty-five members of the Senate, co-signed a letter written to the NEA requesting reforms to its grant making policies. A month later the House passed an amendment that no NEA funds may be re-granted by other organizations, therefore only work that the NEA sponsored itself will receive its funding. In March 1990 NEA grantees began receiving a new clause in their agreements that states:

Public Law 101-121 requires that: None of the funds authorized to be appropriated for the National Endowment for the Arts ... may be used to promote, disseminate, or produce materials which in the judgement of the National Endowment for the Arts ... may be considered obscene, including but not limited to, depictions of sadomasochism, homoerotocism [sic], the sexual exploitation of children, or individuals engaged in sex acts and which, when taken as a whole, do not have serious literary, artistic, political or scientific value.
