= Nancy Hanks (art historian) =

American art historian

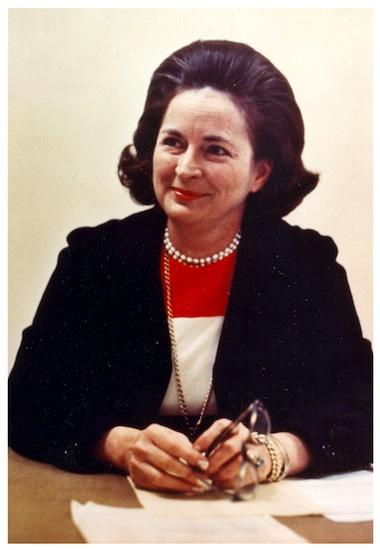
Nancy Hanks, Chair of the National Endowment for the Arts (1969–77)

Nancy Hanks (December 31, 1927 – January 7, 1983) was an American arts administrator and art historian. She was the second chairman of the National Endowment for the Arts (NEA), appointed by President Richard M. Nixon and served from 1969 to 1977, continuing her service under President Gerald R. Ford. During this period, Hanks was active in the fight to save the historic Old Post Office building in Washington, D.C. from demolition. In 1983, it was officially renamed the Nancy Hanks Center, in her honor.

== Early life ==
Nancy Hanks was born in Miami Beach, Florida, on December 31, 1927. She was a distant cousin of Nancy (Hanks) Lincoln, the mother of President Abraham Lincoln. She moved to Montclair, New Jersey while she was in high school.

Hanks attended Duke University, where she majored in political science and was a member of Kappa Alpha Theta sorority.

== Career ==
Hanks was the first woman to serve as the Chairman of the NEA and her political skills enabled her to increase NEA's funding from US$8 million to US$114 million over her eight-year tenure.

Hanks's early work, before becoming NEA chairman, on the Advisory Committee on Government Organization connected her with Nelson Rockefeller. Nelson's brother John provided resources from the Rockefeller Brothers Fund to the study of art. This resulted in The Performing Arts: Problems and Projects (1965) related to John Rockefeller's and Hanks's belief that the government should study, but not contribute to, the arts.

Nancy Hanks was an effective Arts Endowment chairmen because she understood politics as well as how to be a diplomat. Hanks was astute at flattering members of Congress and fearlessly took control of the National Council of the Arts: Hanks' relationship to the National Council on the Arts was very different from Roger Stevens', the former chair. Stevens and his first Council members were peers, equals—and their actions and decisions were a true collaboration. Hanks was not from the arts community; she was much more a political than an artistic force. She controlled the Council as Stevens had never tried to do. The Council, in Hanks's years, did little more than ratify the chair, who was very strong in her management of them. Michael Straight describes Hanks's "imposing her will on the issues that mattered most to her.

According to Elaine A. King, who wrote her dissertation at Northwestern University on the National Endowment for the Arts and Pluralism in the U.S. Visual Arts, "Nancy Hanks perhaps was able to accomplish her mission because she functioned as a type of benevolent art dictator rather than mucking with multiple agendas and political red-tape. From 1969 through 1977, under Hanks' administration, the Arts Endowment functioned like a fine piece of oiled machinery. Hanks continuously obtained the requested essential appropriations from Congress because of her genius in implementing the power of the lobby system. Although she had not had direct administrative experience in the federal government, some people were skeptical at the beginning of her term. Those in doubt underestimated her bureaucratic astuteness and her ability to direct this complex cultural office. Richard Nixon's early endorsement of the arts benefited the Arts Endowment in several ways. The budget for the Arts Endowment not only increased but also more federal funding became available and numerous programs within the agency."

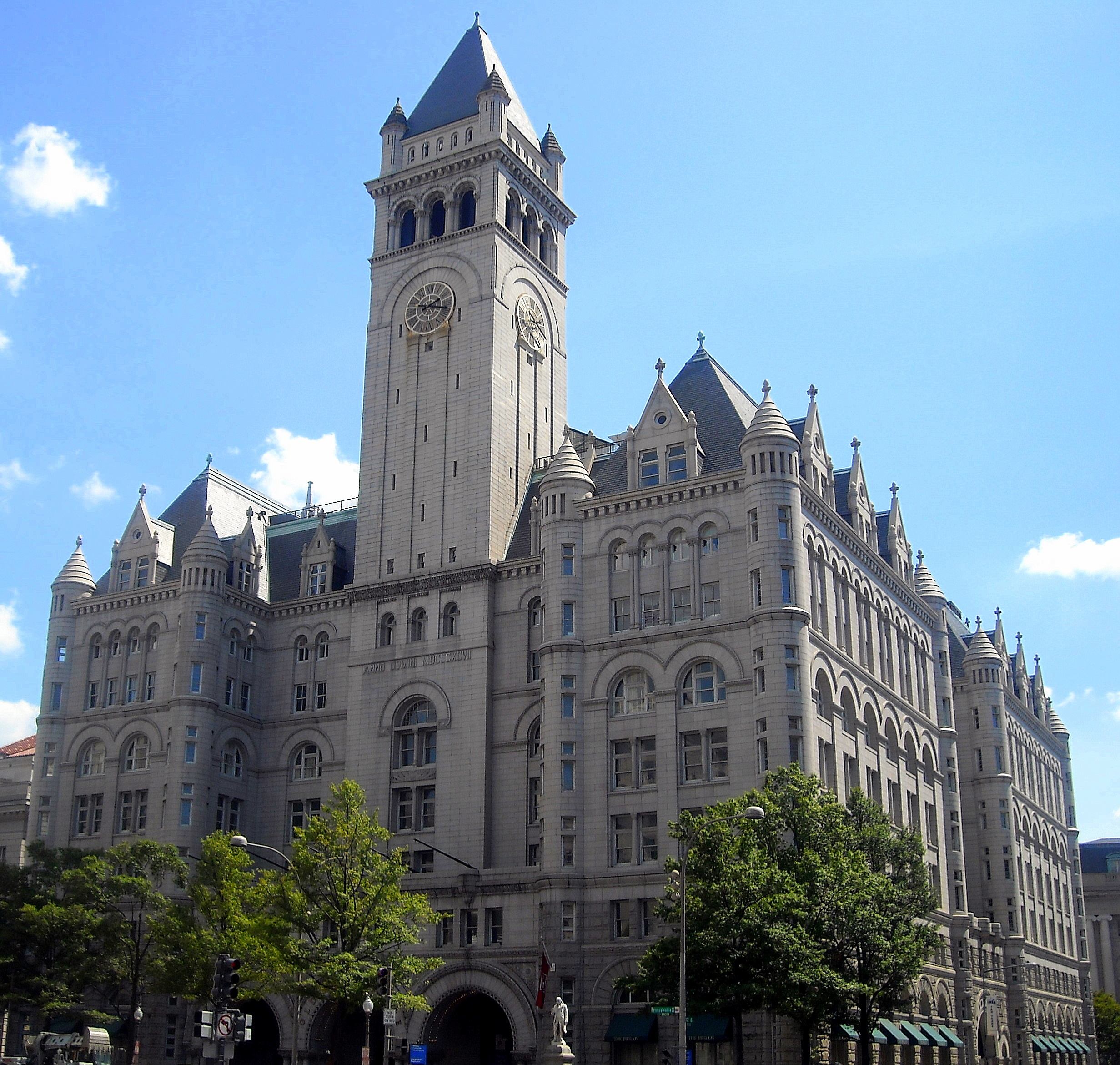
The Old Post Office, Washington, D.C., now known as the Nancy Hanks Center

The American Association of Museums established an award in her honor. The award recognizes a specific achievement that has benefited either the honoree's home institution or the museum field in general. The cited achievement may be in any area of a museum's operation: administration, exhibitions, education, public relations, registration, collections management, or development. Alternatively, the accomplishment may benefit the museum field generally (for instance, a development plan, membership plan, exhibition design, or collection policy that can serve as a model for other museums). Nominees for this award must have less than ten years in the museum field.

In 1975, the National Institute of Social Sciences awarded her their Gold Medal in honor of her service to humanity.

An act of the United States Congress honored Hanks by designating the newly renovated Old Post Office in Washington, D.C. The Nancy Hanks Center, in recognition of her enduring contributions to the arts. Hanks was not reappointed under Jimmy Carter and lost support from leaders of state and local art groups. The groups grew irritated that she had neglected the working relationships between federal and state agencies, and thought that she gave herself too much power.

On January 7, 1983, Nancy Hanks died of cancer at the age of 55 in New York City.

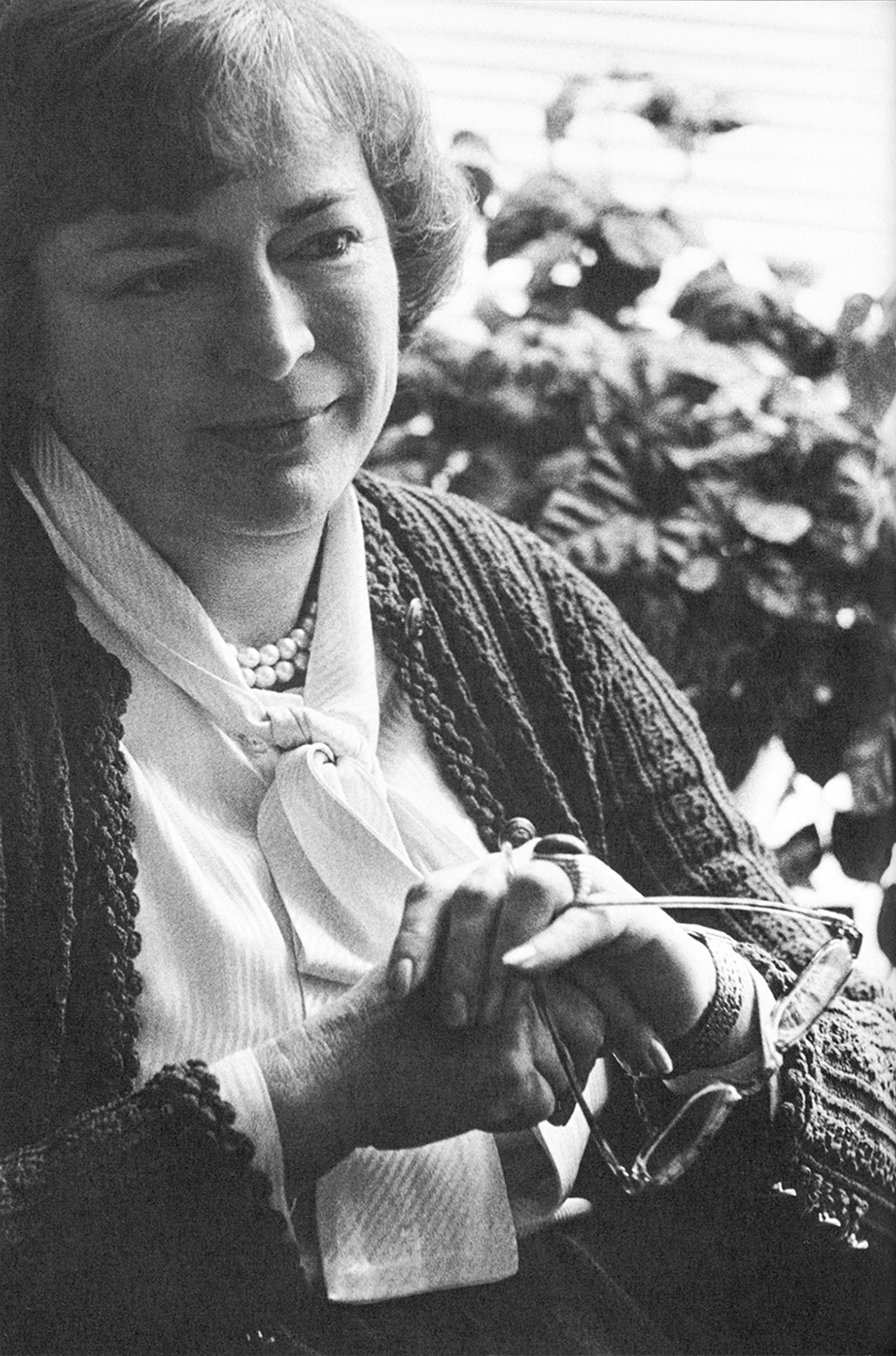
Nancy Hanks photographed by Lynn Gilbert

== See also ==
- Women in the art history field
