= Throwaway Kids =

1981 American television investigative report

Throwaway Kids was a two-part investigative report airing on the ABC News television series 20/20 in 1981.

The report followed a nine-month undercover investigation by producers Karen Burnes and Bill Lichtenstein. The reports detailed the documented abuse, neglect, and preventable deaths among children, the aged, and those with mental illness who were in the care and custody of the Oklahoma Department of Human Services.

Producer Karen Burnes filming "Throwaway Kids" for ABC News 20/20 in Oklahoma, 1981.

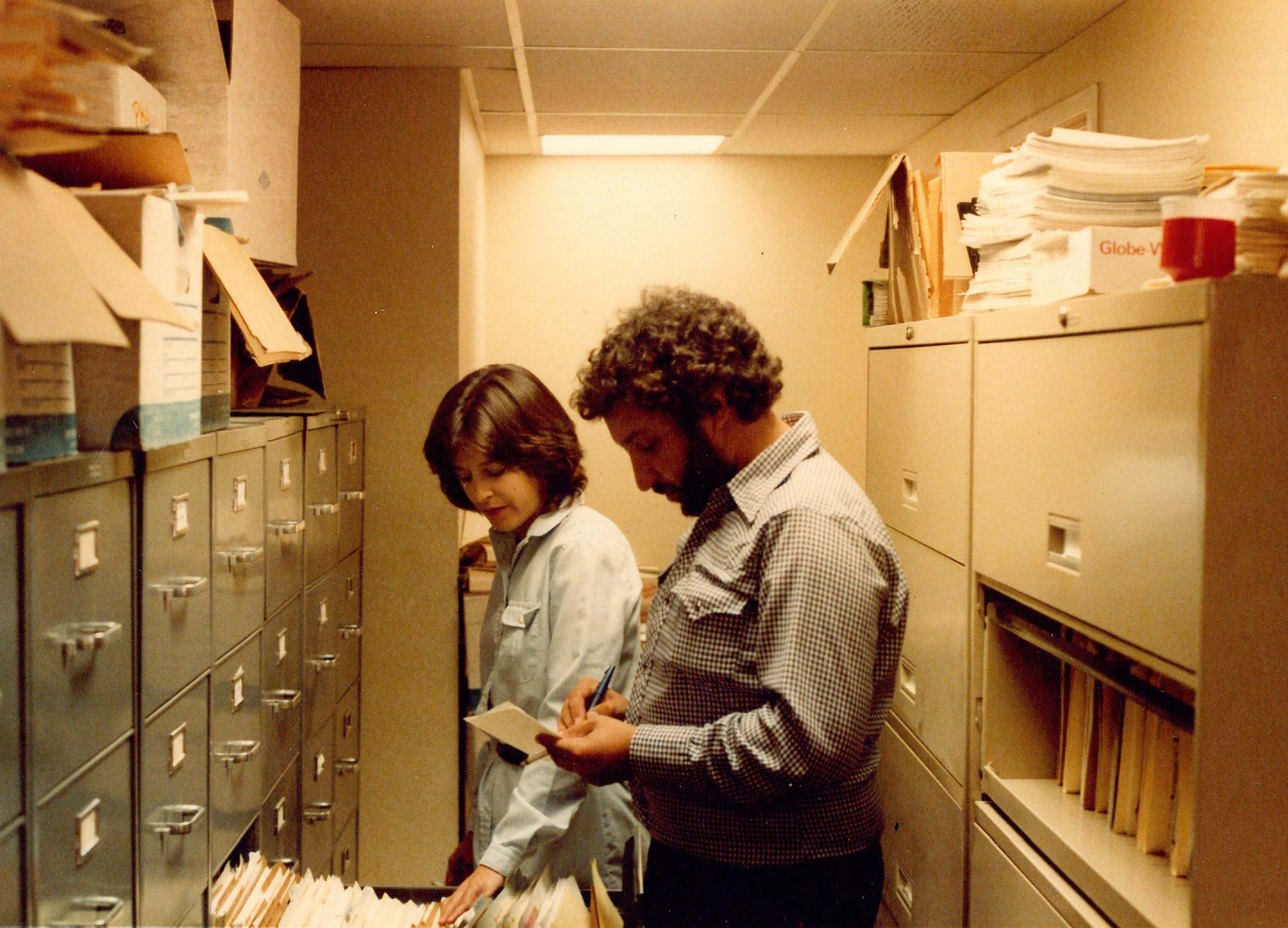
Producer Bill Lichtenstein in Oklahoma during production of "Throwaway Kids" for ABC News 20/20, 1981.

The main focus of the reports were the state's "warehousing" of children, many of whom were in state custody for being abused or abandoned. In turn, the state received per diem federal funds for each child in its custody, but it failed to provide appropriate services for the children with the revenue.

At the time of the program, Oklahoma had no foster care system, so children who were abandoned, abused, neglected, or in need of supervision, were placed in large, outmoded, state-run institutions, many of which were located in rural towns of the state, and were without services or proper care. Lichtenstein and Burnes obtained thousands of pages of confidential "Abuse Reports," generated by state workers and kept by the Department of Human Services, detailing the mistreatment of children in state's custody, ranging from children being beaten by often unqualified staff, to kids being locked in isolation for weeks at a time. There were also numerous unexplained deaths at the state hospital for children with intellectual disability, which the investigation showed were the result of neglect and abuse by state workers.

Burnes and Lichtenstein were part of a team of reporters who collaborated on the investigation, which included ABC's Sylvia Chase, Pulitzer Prize-winners John Hanchette and Carlton Sherwood of Gannett News Service, and the investigative team including Terri Watkins, Bill Gallagher and Skip Nicholson from local TV station KOCO, which was an ABC affiliate and was owned by Gannett. This unprecedented investigation, involving national and local broadcast and print reporters, culminated with articles published by Gannett, a special two-part report on 20/20, "Throwaway Kids", produced by Burnes and Lichtenstein, and a series, "Oklahoma Shame", which aired locally in Oklahoma City on KOCO-TV. The series was honored with a 1982 Peabody Award and a National Headliner Award, and was nominated for a national news Emmy Award.

In 1978, plaintiffs filed a class action lawsuit with claims the defendant violated their constitutional rights. Legal Aid of Western Oklahoma, Inc., the National Juvenile Law Center, and the Public Defender of Oklahoma County, brought the suit forward on behalf of the plaintiffs and all future plaintiffs. The defendants listed in the case are: Boley State School for Boys, Oklahoma Children's Center, State Central Oklahoma Juvenile Treatment Center, L.E. Rader Diagnostic & Evaluation Center, L.E. Rader Intensive Treatment Center, and the Taft Whitaker State Children's Home. The suit was brought before Judge Ralph G. Thompson of the U.S. District Court Western District of Oklahoma. It sought injunction of practices alleged to be unlawful and breached their constitutional rights. Those practices included the use of solitary confinement against minors and mentally unfit, use of metal or material restraint as punishment or relief, barred access to legal counsel, and neglect of health services. Preliminary relief was granted to the plaintiff, and in 1998 the case was closed.

In 1982, Lloyd E. Rader Sr. resigned from his position as director of the Oklahoma Department of Human Services after 31 years of service. The DHS was in the midst of a state investigation of financial misconduct involving patronage, illegal corporate hirings and abuse of the state bid system. Rader was accused of misappropriating state funds to hire private detectives to follow and harass reporters investigating the Department of Human Services. Additional allegations surfaced that he had used state workers to build a clinic for his son, Lloyd Rader Jr., a doctor. The investigative team also uncovered what Rader referred to as his 130-page "legislative control file", containing the favors and patronage he had given to leading representatives in the state, up through Gov. George Nigh and U.S. Senator David Boren.

Today, the Oklahoma Department of Human Services is the largest state department in Oklahoma, employing 6,217 associates in 2023. It has a budget of over $5 billion, $753 million coming from state funding and $5.1 billion in federal aid. As of April 2010, the department was involved in another lawsuit, with the advocacy group Children's Rights, over its treatment of juveniles in state custody. In 2012 a settlement agreement was reached that required Oklahoma DHS to implement new standards of governing within the foster care system. Judge Gregory K. Frizzell approved the settlement. DHS is required to present good faith changes to a board of co-neutrals appointed by the state and approved by the plaintiffs. A ruling was made in December 2016 that the Oklahoma DHS had implemented good faith changes in 28 of 30 categories.
