= West 47th Street =

2001 film

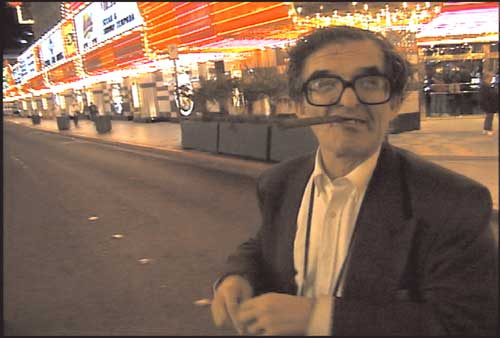
- "Tex" Gordon, a Fountain House member in West 47th Street
- Directed by: Bill Lichtenstein June Peoples
- Produced by: Bill Lichtenstein Lichtenstein Creative Media
- Cinematography: Bill Lichtenstein, Mark Peterson
- Edited by: Spiro Lampros
- Release date: 2001
- Running time: 108 minutes
- Country: United States
- Language: English

West 47th Street is a documentary film produced by Lichtenstein Creative Media. The film follows several people with severe mental illness who are utilising the services of Fountain House, a rehabilitation program in New York City.

== Subject matter ==
West 47th Street is an intimate cinéma vérité portrait of four people with serious mental illness as their lives naturally unfold over a three-year period beginning in spring 2001. The characters are all members of Fountain House, a psychiatric rehabilitation programme located on West 47th Street in a part of New York City once known as Hell's Kitchen.

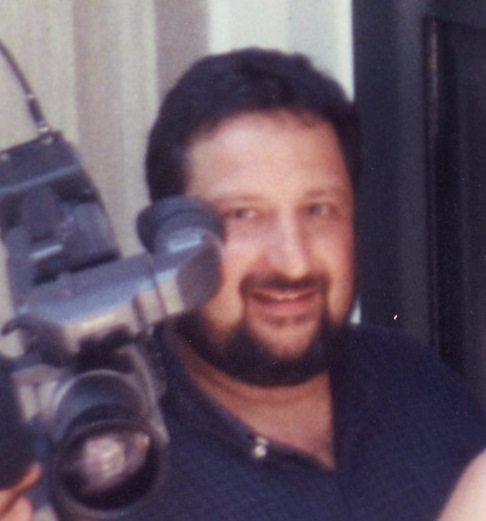
Bill Lichtenstein during production of West 47th Street

The film was the "Editors' Choice – Pick of the Night," by TV Guide.

== Reception ==
West 47th Street was winner of "Best Documentary" at the Atlanta Film Festival, the "Audience Award" at the DC Independent Film Festival, an "Honorable Mention" at the Woodstock Film Festival, sold out theatres across the U.S., and internationally from Vancouver to Dublin to South Korea, and aired on the PBS series "P.O.V." Newsweek called the documentary "must see" and The Washington Post termed it "remarkable."

== Production team and associated campaign ==
The production team included producers Bill Lichtenstein and June Peoples; editor Spiro "Spike" Lampros, winner of a 2009 Emmy Award as editor of Project Runway; Director of Photography Mark Petersson, who shot Barbara Kopple's Academy Award-winning American Dream; and Eddie Marritz, who shot the Academy Award-winning Maya Lin: A Strong Clear Vision.

West 47th Street was the last project of cinema verite pioneer, and Maysles brothers collaborator, Charlotte Zwerin, who served as story editor. Then-New York mayor Rudy Giuliani appears in the documentary.

West 47th Street was accompanied by a major 12-month educational outreach campaign, which involved over 100 screenings across the country. The film's outreach campaign included the distribution of $40,000 in mini-grants made available by LCM to local organizations to utilize screenings of the film to focus on issues of concern in their communities. These included screenings at Grand Rounds at Yale Medical School, on Native American reservations in New Mexico, and use of the film as a training tool for outreach staff at homelessness programs in California. There are over 300 clubhouses based on the clubhouse model around the world coordinated by the International Center for Clubhouse Development.
