= Lloyd E. Rader Sr. =

American state government official

Lloyd E. Rader Sr. (1906–1986) was an Oklahoma state government official. He was appointed director of the Oklahoma Department of Public Welfare (later called the Department of Human Services) in 1951, and ran it until he was forced to resign in 1982, following news media investigations, including ABC's News 20/20's "Throwaway Kids," and reports by Gannett News Service, into the abuse and resulting deaths of children in state custody; patronage; and illegal corporate hirings and abuse of the state bid system. Rader served Oklahoma longer than any other division head, and only state senator Gene Stipe served longer in Oklahoma as a politician.

Rader died on December 6, 1986, in Oklahoma City.

== Institution ==
The Lloyd E. Rader juvenile institution was built and named after Rader in 1972, in Sand Springs, Oklahoma. The institution was subsequently abandoned and demolished in September of 2011. The facility had a reputation for violence, with many assaults on staff and inmates.
