= Suck My Pussy =

Single by Pussy
- Released: 1995
- Genre: electronic dance
- Length: 3:44
- Label: Ramdam Factory
- Songwriters: Karen Finley, Pascal Henninot, Bertrand de Carey
- Producers: Pascal Henninot, Bertrand de Carey

Pussy singles chronology
"Suck My Pussy" (1995)	"I'm a Sleazy Pervert (Shake Shake My Pussy)" (1995)

Suck My Pussy is an electronic dance song by a short-lived project known as Pussy, released in 1995.

== Song information ==
The song was produced by French DJs Pascal Henninot and Bertrand de Carey, and samples sexually explicit vocals from American performance artist Karen Finley's 1986 recording "Tales of Taboo". Finley rants "You don't own me bastard", alluding to the feminist agenda of the original track, and demands that her partner perform cunnilingus on her, while she offers him fellatio.

"Suck My Pussy" was originally released in France on Ramdam Factory, where it peaked at number 22, staying in charts for 14 weeks. It subsequently was released internationally on various minor labels, however, with no further chart success. The song would appear on numerous various artists compilation, among others Super Dance Mix 95.

== Charts ==
Chart (1995)	Peak position
French Singles Chart	22

== Track listing ==
- CD single (1995)
1. "Suck My Pussy" (Radio Edit) – 3:44
2. "Suck My Pussy" (Can U Dance Mix) – 6:31
3. "Suck My Pussy" (Suck My Trance Mix) – 6:20
- CD maxi single (1995)
1. "Suck My Pussy" (Radio Edit) – 3:44
2. "Suck My Pussy" (Can U Dance Mix) – 6:31
3. "Suck My Pussy" (Suck My Trance Mix) – 6:20
4. "Suck My Pussy" (N.1.C Full House Mix) – 6:59
- 12" single (1995)

A. "Suck My Pussy" (Can U Dance Mix) – 6:31
B. "Suck My Pussy" (Suck My Trance Mix) – 6:20

- 12" maxi single (1995)

A1. "Suck My Pussy" (Can U Dance Mix) – 6:31
A2. "Suck My Pussy" (Suck My Trance Mix) – 6:20
B1. "Suck My Pussy" (Heavy Rotation Trance Remix) – 6:47
B2. "Suck My Pussy" (N.1.C Full House Mix) – 6:59
