= Catharina Baart Biddle =

Dutch artist, educator, philanthropist

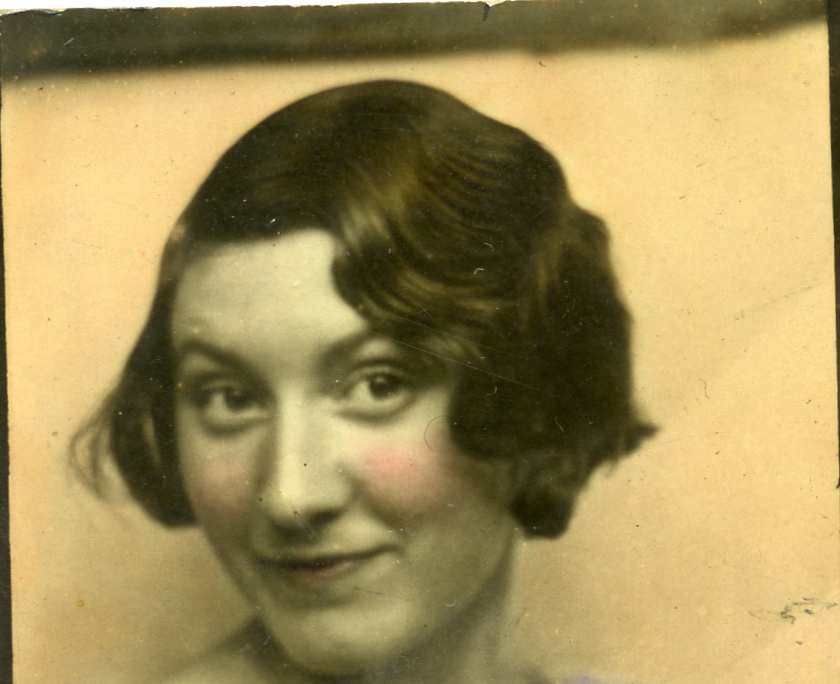
- Born: Catharina Baart; December 8, 1912; The Netherlands
- Died: February 19, 2005 (aged 92); Washington, D.C.
- Education: George Washington University, American University
- Spouses: Ralph W. Stephan; Livingston Biddle

Catharina Baart Biddle (December 8, 1912 - February 19, 2005) was an artist, educator, and philanthropist.

== Biography and career ==
Born in the Netherlands, Biddle immigrated to Long Island, New York at age 12, accompanied by her sister Mary Baart Snelling. After earning both her B.A. (1938) and M.A. (1940) in art from George Washington University (GWU) in Washington, D.C., Biddle turned down a job offer from her alma mater and left in 1945 for extensive travels through Western Europe and North Africa. She spent the next several years painting, studying at the Académie de la Grande Chaumière in Paris and meeting artists including Henri Matisse, Raoul Dufy, and Pablo Picasso.

After returning to Washington, D.C. in the early 1950s, Biddle began to work as an educator, teaching at public schools, the National Gallery of Art, and taking private students. After marrying Ralph W. Stephan in 1956, the couple moved to Libya in 1960, where Biddle continued to paint, teach, and exhibit her work. The Stephans returned to Washington, D.C. in the late 1960s where Biddle returned to teaching in the D.C. public school system, the couple eventually divorcing in 1967.

In 1973, Biddle married Livingston Biddle, a writer and arts advocate. Catharina Biddle retired from teaching in 1974 in order to focus on her art and, in 1981, earned an M.F.A.in painting from American University (AU). Over the last few decades of her life, Biddle was featured in several solo and group exhibitions and worked, along with her husband, as an active proponent for women artists and art education. In 2002, Catharina helped endow the International Gallery at the National Museum of Women in the Arts as a tribute to her husband and their passion for the arts, and created a scholarship fund for undergraduate and graduate studio arts students at AU.

After suffering from Parkinson's disease, Biddle died from pneumonia in 2005.

== Artistic work and influences ==
Biddle's work is noted for its emphasis on light, shadow and color, and the influence of Dutch masters including Rembrandt and Van Gogh. Her work is currently part of the permanent collection at the National Museum of Women in the Arts.
