= Áine Phillips =

Irish artist

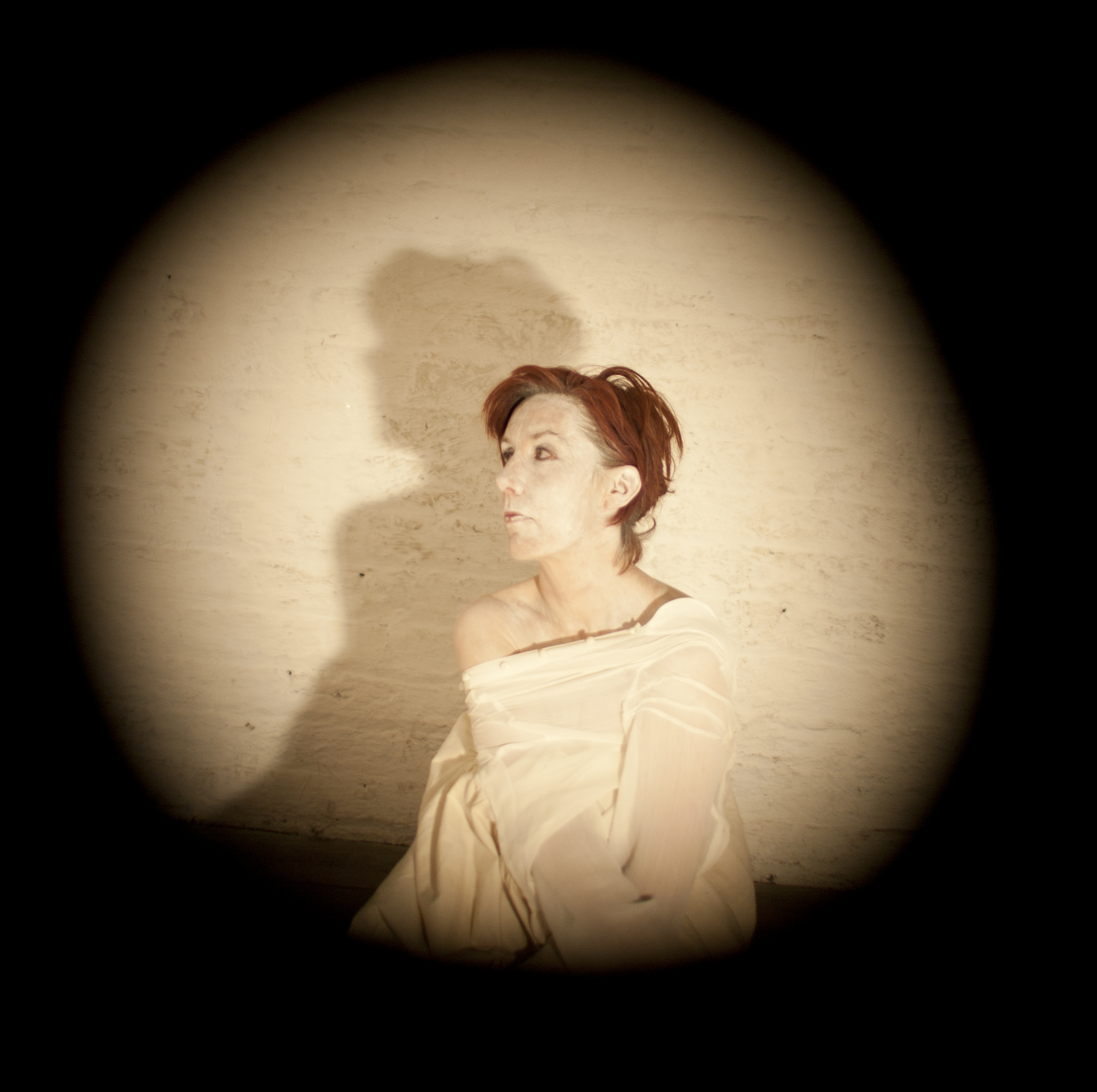
- Áine Phillips performing at the event 'Right Here, Right Now'.
- Education: National College of Art and Design (1988 and 2009) and Limerick School of Art and Design (2001)
- Website: https://ainephillips.com/

Áine Phillips is a performance and visual artist based in Galway, Ireland.

== Education ==
Phillips received her Bachelors of Arts in Fine Art Sculpture at the National College of Art and Design in Dublin in 1988. In 2001, she received her Masters of Fine Art in Research at Limerick School of Art and Design. Eight years later, Phillips acquired a Practice Based PhD in Fine Art Sculpture at National College of Art and Design.

== Work ==
Phillips has been exhibiting multi-media installation and performance works internationally since the late 1980s. Some of her major exhibitions include Moving Image Gallery and The Kitchen New York, National Review of Live Art, Glasgow, Irish Film Centre, Dublin Live Art Festival, Arthouse Dublin, EV+A Limerick, and the Hugh Lane, Dublin.

Her work has been shown in solo and group exhibitions, and selected screenings and film festivals in countries across the world, including Sweden, Brazil, Australia, and the United States. Phillips work has been supported by the Live Art Development Agency in London, and the Arts Council of Ireland.

Phillips is the Head of Sculpture at Burren College of Art in Ballyvaughan, County Clare, Ireland.

== Awards ==
Phillips has received many awards, some of which include:

- 2021: Arts Council Agility Award and Fingal County Arts Office Bursary
- 2019: Arts Council Project Award and Galway 2020 European Capital of Culture Award
- 2017: Arts Council Project Award
- 2015: Culture Ireland Travel Grant
- 2014: Clare County Council Arts Office Artists Support Grant
- 2013: Arts Council Project Award and Culture Ireland Travel Award
- 2012: Clare County Council Arts Office Artists Support Grant
- 2011: Arts Council Touring Award and Clare County Council Arts Office Artists Support Grant
- 2010: Arts Council Project Award and Galway County Council Per Cent for Art Award
- 2010: Culture Ireland Touring Grant and Japan Foundation and British Council Awards
- 2009: Arts Council of Ireland Artists Bursary and Project Award for Live@8
- 2008: Clare County Council Arts Awards and Culture Ireland Travel Award
- 2005: Arts Council of Ireland Commission Award with Tulca Festival Galway
- 2004: Clare County Council Public Art Commission
- 2003: European Commission for Education and Culture Art Project Funding
- 2002: Department of Foreign Affairs, Cultural Relations Committee Award
