= Club Fuck! =

Nightclub in Los Angeles, California, US

Coordinates: 34.09222°N 118.27964°W

Club Fuck! (also known as Club FUCK!) was a nightclub that officially began the summer of 1989 and was hosted by Miguel Beristain, Cliff Diller, and James Stone.

The weekly party was located at Basgo's Disco in the Silver Lake neighborhood of Los Angeles. It later moved to Dragonfly Bar in West Hollywood and lasted until 1993, when it was raided by the Los Angeles Police Department's Vice Division. Fuck! constituted a gritty liminal space oppositional to both the neighborhood's largely men-only leather bars as well as the clean-cut bars of West Hollywood. At Fuck! the modified, pierced, and tattooed body was front and center. Scarring, mummification, and piercing were staples at Fuck!, confronting fears of contagion while revealing the temporality of the body during the height of the AIDS crisis. Performances at Fuck! were both transgressive and theatrical, pushing the limits of what the performer's body (and audience) could endure with a spirit of play.

In an April 1991 article in the LA Weekly, Fuck! was described as not simply "an existential exercise in bad attitudes", but rather "a celebration of the primal life force amped up to overload", with an "S&M/sexual subtext" that makes it "sociologically fascinating".

On August 5, 2009, Antebellum Hollywood presented Club Fuck! 20 year reunion, featuring photography, artworks, posters, and memorabilia from the people who created the club. Curated by Rick Castro, the event featuring live performance by Club Fuck original Linda Lesabre, original playlist from DJ John Mark, artwork and contributions from James Stone, Michelle Carr, Catherine Opie, Sheree Rose, Jenny Shimizu and more.

Club Fuck was the subject of the exhibition entitled "FUCK! Loss, desire and pleasure" curated by Lucia Fabio and Toro Castaño at USC's ONE Archives.
