= National Endowment for the Arts v. Finley =

- Supreme Court of the United States

Argued March 31, 1998 Decided June 25, 1998
- Full case name: National Endowment for the Arts v. Finley, et al.
- Citations: 524 U.S. 569 (more) 118 S. Ct. 2168; 141 L. Ed. 2d 500

Holding
- Section 954(d)(1) is facially valid, as it neither inherently interferes with First Amendment rights nor violates constitutional vagueness principles.

Court membership
- Chief Justice William Rehnquist Associate Justices John P. Stevens · Sandra Day O'Connor; Antonin Scalia · Anthony Kennedy; David Souter · Clarence Thomas; Ruth Bader Ginsburg · Stephen Breyer

Case opinions
- Majority: O'Connor, joined by Rehnquist, Stevens, Kennedy, Breyer; Ginsburg (all but Part II–B)
- Concurrence: Scalia (in judgment), joined by Thomas
- Dissent: Souter

National Endowment for the Arts v. Finley, 524 U.S. 569 (1998), was a United States Supreme Court case in which the Court ruled that the National Foundation on the Arts and Humanities Act, as amended in 1990, (20 U.S.C. § 954(d)(1)), was facially valid, as it neither inherently interfered with First Amendment rights nor violated constitutional vagueness principles. The act in question required the chairperson of the National Endowment for the Arts (NEA) to ensure that "artistic excellence and artistic merit are the criteria by which [grant] applications are judged, taking into consideration general standards of decency and respect for the diverse beliefs and values of the American public". Justice Sandra Day O'Connor delivered the opinion of the Court.

== Background ==
Congress established the National Endowment for the Arts in 1965 as an independent agency of the federal government. As of 2012, the NEA had awarded more than $4 billion to support artistic excellence, creativity, and innovation for the benefit of individuals and communities.

Since its establishment, the NEA has funded thousands of individual artists and arts organizations. In 1989, two controversial works were partially or fully funded by NEA grants. The Institute of Contemporary Art at the University of Pennsylvania used $30,000 of a visual arts grant from the NEA to fund a retrospective of Robert Mapplethorpe’s work. The exhibit, titled "The Perfect Moment", included homoerotic photographs that some members of Congress deemed pornographic. Members of Congress also criticized Andres Serrano's work Piss Christ, a photograph of a crucifix submerged in urine. The Southeast Center for Contemporary Arts, which also received funding from the NEA, awarded Serrano a $15,000 grant.

In response to the use of NEA grants to fund these projects, Congress created an Independent Commission of constitutional law scholars to review the NEA's grant-making process and make recommendations. Ultimately, Congress adopted the Williams/Coleman Amendment. The Amendment became §954(d)(1), which directs the NEA chairperson to judge the artistic merit of grant applications while also "tak[ing] into consideration general standards of decency and respect for the diverse beliefs and values of the American public".

The case ultimately known as NEA v. Finley was filed by four individual performance artists—Karen Finley, John Fleck, Holly Hughes, and Tim Miller—and the National Association of Artists' Organizations (NAAO). The plaintiffs alleged that the defendants, the NEA and NEA Chairperson John E. Frohnmayer violated their constitutional rights by denying their applications for NEA grants. They sought declaratory and injunctive relief on their constitutional and statutory funding claims, and damages on an additional Privacy Act claim. In addition, plaintiffs sought a declaration that the so-called "decency clause" of 20 U.S.C. 954(d) was void for vagueness and violated the First Amendment on its face.

The Supreme Court heard two motions. The first was the defendants' motion for judgment on the pleadings. Defendants argued that: (1) the NEA's funding decisions are unreviewable because they are committed to agency discretion by law; (2) venue was improper as to the Privacy Act claim; and (3) plaintiffs lacked standing to challenge the facial validity of the "decency clause" because they cannot establish the necessary injury. The Court also considered plaintiffs' motion for summary judgment on their facial challenge to the "decency clause".

== Lower courts ==
=== District Court ===
The District Court found that the decency clause debased the First Amendment by deceitfully preventing some forms of protected speech and that the clause was vague under the Fifth Amendment. The District Court rejected the NEA’s argument that "decency" and "respect" are implicit and voluntary standards in funding evaluations. Instead, the court ruled that the clause represents criteria to determine eligibility for NEA grants and that an overbroad statute would restrict protected and unprotected speech. The court held that while the government may constitutionally regulate "obscene" speech, the decency clause might repress indecent speech, a form of expression immune from substantial governmental obstruction.

The court also argued that in certain protected areas, such as public education funding, government grants "may not be used to suppress unpopular expression". Since both academic expression and artistic expression reach the core of a democratic society’s cultural and political vitality, the court found that, as with education funding, art funding enhances education neutrality.

=== Ninth Circuit ===
The Ninth Circuit Court of Appeals confirmed the district court’s finding and ruled in Finley’s favor.

== Supreme Court ==
The Supreme Court overturned the Court of Appeals decision. It found that decency does not certainly interfere with the First Amendment right to free expression and does not violate the Fifth Amendment's void for vagueness provision. The court found that 20 U.S.C. § 954(d)(1) merely adds factors to the grant-making process. It does not say that all grants should be denied to applications involving indecent or disrespectful artworks. Although the statute does not state how much weight the Advisory Commission should give these factors, the NEA has wide discretion in considering this provision.

Also, the Court held that Finley carried the burden of demonstrating that there is a substantial risk that the application of the decency clause will lead to the suppression of speech. But the Court found that the provision on its face is very clear that decency and respect are only considerations; it is not a provision that compels the chairperson to require decency and respect in every application. Because the subject matter is open to different interpretations, the Court determined that in the context of selected artistic subsidies it is not possible at all times for Congress to legislate with clarity and it is difficult to establish a precise criterion when granting subsidies.

=== Majority ===
Justice O'Connor wrote the majority opinion, joined by Chief Justice Rehnquist and Justices Stevens, Kennedy, Ginsburg, and Breyer. The meaning of the section 954(d) obligation to take into consideration decency and respect for diverse beliefs and values had been debated throughout the litigation. From the outset, the NEA had argued that it could discharge this obligation simply by ensuring that the membership on the review panels reflected national diversity. But both the district court and the court of appeals decisively rejected this reading. Like the lower courts, Justice Souter's dissent disposed of this reading as inconsistent with the text and legislative history, as well as redundant because another statutory provision already required the chairperson to consider diversity in selecting the panels. The majority noted that it need not evaluate the NEA's interpretation because the statute was constitutional on its face even if construed more broadly.

O'Connor wrote, "when Congress has in fact intended to affirmatively constrain the NEA's grant-making authority, it has done so in no uncertain terms"—for example, the prohibition against awarding grants for obscene works. Neither Souter nor Justice Scalia necessarily rejected the Court's interpretation of the statute. Scalia began his opinion, "'The operation was a success, but the patient died.' What such a procedure is to medicine, the Court's opinion in this case is to the law. It sustains the constitutionality of 20 U.S.C. 954(d)(1) by gutting it."

From the conclusion that "consideration" is not equivalent to prohibition, the Court reasoned that the factors to be taken into consideration—"decency" and "respect" for diverse beliefs and values—are not intended to "disallow any particular viewpoints". The Court noted that the legislation was bipartisan, a compromise position designed to counter proposals to abolish the NEA.

== See also ==
- List of United States Supreme Court cases, volume 524
