= Chun Hua Catherine Dong =

Canadian multimedia artist

Chun Hua Catherine Dong is a Chinese-born Canadian Intermedia artist. Dong’s artistic practice is based in performance art, photography, video, installation, virtuality (VR), augmented reality (AR), and 3D printing within the contemporary context of global feminism.

== Biography ==
Chun Hua Catherine Dong was born in Hunan province in China. Dong moved to Canada in 2002 and now lives in Tiohtià:ke/ Montréal. Dong received a BFA in Visual Art from Emily Carr University Art & Design in 2011 and an MFA in Intermedia from Concordia University in 2015.

Dong started their artistic career as a performance artist in 2009. Dong uses the body—often their own body— as a primary material to activate social commentary on gender, identity, and immigration. In Later 2019, Dong focuses on art and technology, exploring new digital possibilities for bridging gaps between memories and experiences, whilst mediating culture and identity through the lens of gender and diaspora.

Dong was the recipient of the Franklin Furnace Award for performance art in New York in 2014, listed the “10 Artists Who Are Reinventing History” by Canadian Art in 2017, and was named "The Artist of the Year" at the DongGang International Photo Festival in South Korea in 2018. Dong was also a finalist for the Contemporary Art Award at Le Musée national des beaux-arts du Québec (Prix en art actuel du MNBAQ) 2020, and awarded with the Cultural Diversity in Visual Arts Award by the Conseil des arts de Montréal in 2021. In 2024, Dong was long-listed for the Sobey Art Award, a Canadian contemporary art prize.

== Selected exhibitions ==
Dong has exhibited their works at The International Digital Art Biennial Montreal (BIAN), MOMENTA | Biennale de l’image, Quebec City Biennial, Kaunas Biennial,The Musée d’Art Contemporain du Val-de-Marne in France, Canadian Cultural Centre Paris, The Aine Art Museum in Tornio, Bury Art Museum in Manchester, Museo de la Cancillería in Mexico City, Art Gallery of Hamilton, Canadian Museum of Immigration at Pier 21, DongGong Museum of Photograph in South Korea, He Xiangning Art Museum in Shenzhen, Hubei Museum of Fine Art in Wuhan, Art Museum at University of Toronto, Varley Art Gallery of Markham, and elsewhere.

== Work ==
Dong is known for delving into various media, such as performance, photograph with augmented reality, and virtual reality.

=== I Have Been There (2015 – ongoing) ===
Each time Dong travels to a new place, Dong creates a duvet with Chinese traditional fabric. Covered by the duvet, Dong lies on the ground in front of historical sites, landmarks, tourist attractions, and other significant places or events around the world. Dong repeats this performance as a poetic expression of their diasporic identity and engagement with different cultures and spaces. As a performance artist, Dong uses their body as a primary material in their work, creating visual narratives that enable audiences to experience performance unexpectedly and directly in public spaces.

=== Skin Deep (2014 -2020) ===
"Skin Deep" is a series of photographs with a Augmented Reality component that explores surface of thing – face- in relation Asian shame culture through performing self-portraits. Dong translates the word "shame" as a cultural symbol and creates a series of ID -card photographs by concealing their face in Chinese symbolic silk fabrics. This work points to the deeply embedded feelings of shame that can cause women to hold back and stay silent, transforming the performative gestures into experiences that are understood to be universal and relatable. Augmented Reality is used to enhance the viewers' experience of the photograph and makes static photographs alive and architectural. When one downloads a free app on one's smart phone, opens the app and points at a "Skin Deep" photograph, an animated video will appear on one's phone screen.

=== Meet Me Halfway (2021) ===
Meet Me Halfway is a multi-channel VR video installation that explores the perception of time and space in virtual reality (VR) and the inability to return to the present from searching the inner world. Dong brought their new passion toward abstraction and their vivid childhood memories into virtual space, creating imaginary worlds that can be experienced both in virtual and in real life. The inner worlds Dong created in VR shifts between concrete and ephemeral, abstract and realistic, 3D to 2D, organic and inorganic with speed, forming temporary structures that constantly expand and collapse in time and space.

=== Mother (2017) ===
“Mother” consists of 14 photographs and a video dedicating to Dong’s absent mother. Absence is a form of presence. Following the death of Dong's mother, Dong returned to China, the country of their birth. Dong found 14 mothers who are close friends and relatives of Dong's mother. Dong bought each mother a pair of floral embroidered traditional Chinese shoes as a gift because Dong mother loved the floral embroidered shoes. Dong and the mother took photographs together at each mother’s home, with the mother wearing the new shoes and Dong wearing the mother's cloth. After taking photos with each mother, Dong invited all mothers to gather for a group portrait, which was later turned into a video.

=== Husbands and I (2009 -2011) ===
"Husbands and I" is a performance wherein Dong navigates her own relationship to Western culture through one-minute and one-day relationships with white men. Dong started the "Husbands and I" performance in 2009 in Vancouver, where Dong wore a traditional Chinese dress and asked white males on streets to have photo taken with her by suggesting them to be her husbands for a minute. Dong has had photos with 325 men. In 2010, Dong posted classified advertisements describing herself as "an exotic, compliant and artistic Asian girl looking for a white husband who would like to take her to his home to live with him for a day as his mail order bride". Dong recorded videos of her experiences living for one day with each ad respondent.

== Career ==
=== Selected solo exhibitions ===
- At the Edge of Two Worlds, The Rooms Museums, St. John’s, NL, Canada, 2023
- Cleavage, Arcade Project Curatorial, New York City, USA, 2022
- Chun Hua Catherine Dong, Varley Art Gallery of Markham, Markham, Canada, 2022
- At the Edge of Two World, TRUCK Contemporary, Calgary, Canada, 2022
- So Close Yet So Far Away, Gallery 101, Ottawa, ON, Canada, 2022
- Chun Hua Catherine Dong, Art Gallery of Hamilton, Hamilton, Canada, 2021
- Meet Me Halfway, la Central Galerie Powerhouse, Montreal, Canada, 2021
- THEY, Le Lieu, centre en art actuel, Quebec City, Canada, 2018
- Age of Love, DongGang Museum of Photography, DongGang International Photo Festival, Korea, 2018
- Visual Poetics of Embodied Shame, ace arti nc. Winnipeg, Canada, 2016
- To Rebel is Justified, MAI (Montréal, arts interculturels), Montréal, Canada, 2015
- Visual Poetics of Embodied Shame, Hamilton Artists Inc. Hamilton, Canada, 2015
- Between Reality and Transcendence, Articule | Artist Run Centre, Montreal, Canada, 2014

=== Selected group exhibition and performance ===
- METAMORPHOSIS – MUTATION, The International Digital Art Biennial (BIAN), Montreal, Canada, 2022
- Skin Deep, Nuit Blanch Toronto, the North York Centre, commissioned by the City of Toronto, Canada, 2022
- Art Me!, Galerie Charlot, Paris, France, 2022
- Now You See Me, Doris McCathy Gallery, Contact Photograph Festival, Toronto, Canada, 2022
- Descendance, SPAO Centre, Ottawa, Canada, 2022
- The 4th Global Overseas Chinese Artists Exhibition, He Xiangning Art Museum, Shenzhen, China, 2021
- The Misfits, Capture Photography Festival, presented by Richmond Art Gallery (Public Art)), Vancouver, Canada, 2021
- I Have Been There, CAFKA Biennial – Contemporary Art in Public Space, Kitchener, Canada (Public Art), 2021
- Physis: Production of Nature, Human and Technology, HuBei Museum of Fine Art, WuHan, China, 2021
- Human Learning. What Machines Teach Us. Canadian Cultural Centre Paris, Paris, France, 2021
- The Life of Thing, MOMENTA |Biennale de I’image, Galerie de I’ UQAM, Montreal, Canada, 2019
- Sans Réserve, The Musée d’Art Contemporain du Val-de-Marne, France, presented by Quebec City Biennial, 2017
- The Art of Joy, Manif d’art 8, Quebec City Biennial, Quebec City, Canada, 2017
- Canada: Day 1, Canadian Museum of Immigration at Pier 21, Halifax, Canada, 2017
- Far and Near: The Distances Between us, Art Museum at University of Toronto, Toronto, Canada 2017
- Mother Tongue, Varley Art Gallery of Markham, Markham, Canada, 2017
- A Very Thin Line, The CERA Project, London, UK, 2016
- The Arrival, 7a*11d International Festival of Performance Art, Toronto, Canada, 2016
- The Lost Twelve Years, Rapid Pulse International Performance Art Festival, Chicago, USA, 2015
- Through the Body, CONTACT Photography Festival, Art Museum at University of Toronto, Toronto, Canada, 2014
- UNITEXT, Kaunas Biennial, National Museum of M. K. Čiurlionis, Kaunas, Lithuania, 2013
