= National Endowment for the Arts =

Independent agency of the US federal government

Agency overview
- Formed: 1965
- Jurisdiction: Federal government of the United States
- Headquarters: Constitution Center, Washington, D.C.
- Annual budget: US$207 million (2023)
- Agency executive: Chairman
- Website: arts.gov

The National Endowment for the Arts (NEA) is an independent agency of the United States federal government that offers support and funding for projects exhibiting artistic excellence. It was created in 1965 as an independent agency of the federal government by an act of the U.S. Congress, signed by President Lyndon B. Johnson on September 29, 1965 (20 U.S.C. 951). It is a sub-agency of the National Foundation on the Arts and the Humanities, along with the National Endowment for the Humanities, the Federal Council on the Arts and the Humanities, and the Institute of Museum and Library Services.

The NEA has its offices in Washington, D.C. It was awarded Tony Honors for Excellence in Theatre in 1995, as well as the Special Tony Award in 2016. In 1985, the NEA won an honorary Oscar from the Academy of Motion Picture Arts and Sciences for its work with the American Film Institute in the identification, acquisition, restoration and preservation of historic films. In 2016 and again in 2017, the National Endowment for the Arts received Emmy nominations from the Television Academy in the Outstanding Short Form Nonfiction or Reality Series category.

In 2025, the Donald Trump administration issued executive orders leading the NEA to ban federal funding for programs promoting diversity, equity, and inclusion (DEI) or "gender ideology", sparking backlash from over 400 artists and a lawsuit from major arts groups with ACLU support. On May 3, the NEA revoked dozens of grants for non-compliance and the same day, Trump proposed eliminating the agency entirely.

== History and purpose ==
The National Endowment for the Arts was created during the term of President Lyndon B. Johnson under the general auspices of the Great Society. According to historian Karen Patricia Heath, "Johnson personally was not much interested in the acquisition of knowledge, cultural or otherwise, for its own sake, nor did he have time for art appreciation or meeting with artists."

The NEA is "dedicated to supporting excellence in the arts, both new and established; bringing the arts to all Americans; and providing leadership in arts education".

== Leadership and initiatives ==
=== Governance ===
The NEA is governed by a chairman nominated by the president to a four-year term and subject to congressional confirmation. The NEA's advisory committee, the National Council on the Arts, advises the chairman on policies and programs, as well as reviewing grant applications, fundraising guidelines, and leadership initiative.

=== National Council on the Arts ===
The council is composed of 25 members, 18 appointed by the president of the United States with the consent of the United States Senate, six ex officio members, and the chairperson of the NEA, who also serves as chair of the council. The six ex officio members are members of Congress, where two are appointed by the Speaker of the House, one by the Minority Leader of the House, two by the Majority Leader of the Senate, and one by the Minority Leader of the Senate. These six serve two-year terms, and serve as nonvoting members of the council.

The eighteen appointed by the President are selected from among private citizens of the United States who are widely recognized for their broad knowledge of, or expertise in, or for their profound interest in the arts; and have established records of distinguished service, or achieved eminence, in the arts; so as to include practicing artists, civic cultural leaders, members of the museum profession, and others who are professionally engaged in the arts; and so as collectively to provide an appropriate distribution of membership among major art fields and interested citizens groups. In making these appointments, the President shall give due regard to equitable representation of women, minorities, and individuals with disabilities who are involved in the arts and shall make such appointments so as to represent equitably all geographical areas in the United States. These are appointed to serve terms of six years. The terms are staggered so three terms end September 3 each year. These members are not eligible for reappointment during the two-year period following the expiration of their term. However, they may continue to serve on the council after their term's expiration until a successor takes office.

Ten members of the council constitutes a quorum.

=== Current council members ===
The current council members as of March 25, 2026:

Position	Name	Confirmed	Term expiration	Appointed by
Chair	Mary Anne Carter	December 18, 2025	December 18, 2028	Donald Trump
Member	Kinan Azmeh	March 15, 2022	September 3, 2024	Joe Biden
Member	Bidtah Becker	March 17, 2022	September 3, 2022	Joe Biden
Member	Bruce Carter	January 1, 2013	September 3, 2018	Barack Obama
Member	Gretchen Gonzales Davidson	March 17, 2022	September 3, 2022	Joe Biden
Member	Aaron Dworkin	August 2, 2011	September 3, 2014	Barack Obama
Member	Kamilah Forbes	February 17, 2022	September 3, 2026	Joe Biden
Member	Deepa Gupta	March 29, 2012	September 3, 2016	Barack Obama
Member	Paul Hodes	August 2, 2012	September 3, 2016	Barack Obama
Member	Emil Kang	September 22, 2012	September 3, 2018	Barack Obama
Member	Michael Lombardo	September 29, 2022	September 3, 2028	Joe Biden
Member	María López De León	January 1, 2013	September 3, 2016	Barack Obama
Member	Huascar Medina	December 18, 2021	September 3, 2026	Joe Biden
Member	Christopher Morgan	March 15, 2022	September 3, 2024	Joe Biden
Member	Fiona Whelan Prine	March 23, 2022	September 3, 2024	Joe Biden
Member	Ranee Ramaswamy	October 16, 2013	September 3, 2018	Barack Obama
Member	Jake Shimabukuro	March 15, 2022	September 3, 2024	Joe Biden
Member	Constance H. Williams	March 15, 2022	September 3, 2026	Joe Biden
Member (non-voting) (ex officio)	Vacant	—	—	John Thune
Member (non-voting) (ex officio)	Vacant	—	—	John Thune
Member (non-voting) (ex officio)	Tammy Baldwin	2013	—	Chuck Schumer
Member (non-voting) (ex officio)	Glenn Thompson	October 4, 2018	—	Paul Ryan, Kevin McCarthy
Member (non-voting) (ex officio)	Vacant	—	—	Mike Johnson
Member (non-voting) (ex officio)	Chellie Pingree	July 2017	—	Nancy Pelosi, Hakeem Jeffries

=== Budget and grants ===
Between 1965 and 2008, the agency has made in excess of 128,000 grants, totaling more than $5 billion. From the mid-1980s to the mid-1990s, Congress granted the NEA an annual funding of between $160 and $180 million. In 1996, Congress cut the NEA funding to $99.5 million as a result of pressure from conservative groups, including the American Family Association, who criticized the agency for using tax dollars to fund highly controversial artists such as Barbara DeGenevieve, Andres Serrano, Robert Mapplethorpe, and the performance artists known as the "NEA Four". Since 1996, the NEA has partially rebounded with a 2015 budget of $146.21 million. In FY 2010, the NEA's budget reached mid-1990s levels with a $167.5 million budget but fell again in FY 2011 with a budget of $154 million. On March 11, 2024, President Joe Biden released the President's Budget for FY 2025, with $210.1 million budgeted for the NEA.

=== Grantmaking ===
The NEA provides grants in the categories of arts projects, national initiatives, and partnership agreements. Grants for arts projects support exemplary projects for artist communities, arts education, dance, design, folk and traditional arts, literature, local arts agencies, media arts, museums, music, musical theater, opera, presenting (including multidisciplinary art forms), theater, and visual arts. The NEA also granted individual fellowships in literature to creative writers and translators of exceptional talent in the areas of prose and poetry, however the Trump administration cancelled those fellowships in August 2025.

The NEA offers partnerships for state, regional, federal, international activities, and design. The state arts agencies and regional arts organizations are the NEA's primary partners in serving the American people through the arts. Forty percent of all NEA funding goes to the state arts agencies and regional arts organizations. Additionally, the NEA awards three Lifetime Honors: NEA National Heritage Fellowships to master folk and traditional artists, NEA Jazz Masters Fellowships to jazz musicians and advocates, and NEA Opera Honors to individuals who have made extraordinary contributions to opera in the United States. The NEA also manages the National Medal of Arts, awarded annually by the President.

=== Relative scope of funding ===
Artist William Powhida has noted that "in one single auction, wealthy collectors bought almost a billion dollars in contemporary art at Christie's in New York." He further commented: "If you had a 2 percent tax just on the auctions in New York you could probably double the NEA budget in two nights."

=== Lifetime honors ===
The NEA is the federal agency responsible for recognizing outstanding achievement in the arts. It does this by awarding three lifetime achievement awards. The NEA Jazz Masters Fellowships are awarded to individuals who have made significant contributions to the art of jazz. The NEA National Heritage Fellowships are awarded for artistic excellence and accomplishments for American's folk and traditional arts. The National Medal of Arts is awarded by the President of the United States and NEA for outstanding contributions to the excellence, growth, support, and availability of the arts in the United States.

== Controversy ==
=== 1981 attempts to abolish ===
Upon entering office in 1981, the incoming Ronald Reagan administration intended to push Congress to abolish the NEA completely over a three-year period. Reagan's first director of the Office of Management and Budget, David A. Stockman, thought the NEA and the National Endowment for the Humanities were "good [departments] to simply bring to a halt because they went too far, and they would be easy to defeat." Another proposal would have halved the arts endowment budget. However, these plans were abandoned when the President's special task force on the arts and humanities, which included close Reagan allies such as conservatives Charlton Heston and Joseph Coors, discovered "the needs involved and benefits of past assistance," concluding that continued federal support was important. Frank Hodsoll became the chairman of the NEA in 1981, and while the department's budget decreased from $158.8 million in 1981 to $143.5 million, by 1989 it was $169.1 million, the highest it had ever been.

=== 1989 objections ===
In 1989, Donald Wildmon of the American Family Association held a press conference attacking what he called "anti-Christian bigotry," in an exhibition by photographer Andres Serrano. The work at the center of the controversy was Piss Christ, a photo of a plastic crucifix submerged in a vial of an amber fluid described by the artist as his own urine. Republican Senators Jesse Helms and Al D'Amato began to rally against the NEA, and expanded the attack to include other artists. Prominent conservative Christian figures including Pat Robertson of The 700 Club and Pat Buchanan joined the attacks. Republican representative Dick Armey, an opponent of federal arts funding, began to attack a planned exhibition of photographs by Robert Mapplethorpe at the Corcoran Museum of Art that was to receive NEA support.

On June 12, 1989, The Corcoran cancelled the Mapplethorpe exhibition, saying that it did not want to "adversely affect the NEA's congressional appropriations." The Washington Project for the Arts later hosted the Mapplethorpe show. The cancellation was highly criticized and in September 1989, the Director of the Corcoran gallery, Christina Orr-Cahill, issued a formal statement of apology saying, "The Corcoran Gallery of Art in attempting to defuse the NEA funding controversy by removing itself from the political spotlight, has instead found itself in the center of controversy. By withdrawing from the Mapplethorpe exhibition, we, the board of trustees and the director, have inadvertently offended many members of the arts community which we deeply regret. Our course in the future will be to support art, artists and freedom of expression."

Democratic representative Pat Williams, chairman of the House subcommittee with jurisdiction over the NEA reauthorization, partnered with Republican Tom Coleman to formulate a compromise bill to save the Endowment. The Williams-Coleman substitute increased funding to states arts councils for new programs to expand access to the arts in rural and inner city areas, leave the obscenity determination to the courts, and altered the composition of the review panels to increase diversity of representation and eradicate the possibility of conflicts of interest. After fierce debate, the language embodied in the Williams-Coleman substitute prevailed and subsequently became law.

Though this controversy inspired congressional debate about appropriations to the NEA, including proposed restrictions on the content of NEA-supported work and their grantmaking guidelines, efforts to defund the NEA failed.

=== 1990 performance artists vetoed ===
Conservative media continued to attack individual artists whose NEA-supported work was deemed controversial. The "NEA Four", Karen Finley, Tim Miller, John Fleck, and Holly Hughes, were performance artists whose proposed grants from the United States government's National Endowment for the Arts (NEA) were vetoed by John Frohnmayer in June 1990. Grants were overtly vetoed on the basis of subject matter after the artists had successfully passed through a peer review process. The artists won their case in court in 1993 and were awarded amounts equal to the grant money in question, though the case would make its way to the United States Supreme Court in National Endowment for the Arts v. Finley. The case centered on subsection (d)(1) of 20 U.S.C. § 954 which provides that the NEA Chairperson shall ensure that artistic excellence and artistic merit are the criteria by which applications are judged. The court ruled in 524 U.S. 569 (1998), that Section 954(d)(1) is facially valid, as it neither inherently interferes with First Amendment rights nor violates constitutional vagueness principles.

=== 1995–1997 congressional attacks ===
The 1994 midterm elections cleared the way for House Speaker Newt Gingrich to lead a renewed attack on the NEA. Gingrich had called for the NEA to be eliminated along with the National Endowment for the Humanities and the Corporation for Public Broadcasting. While some in Congress attacked the funding of controversial artists, others argued the endowment was wasteful and elitist. However, despite massive budget cutbacks and the end of grants to individual artists, Gingrich ultimately failed in his push to eliminate the endowment.

=== 2017-18 proposed defunding ===
The budget outline submitted by then-president Donald Trump on March 16, 2017, to Congress would have eliminated all funding for the program. Congress approved a budget that retained NEA funding. The White House budget proposed for fiscal year 2018 again called for elimination of funding, but Congress retained the funding for another year.

=== 2025 Trump administration restrictions ===
In 2025, the NEA imposed restrictions on federal grant applications to comply with President Trump's executive orders 14151 and 14168, barring federal funds for programs focused on diversity, equity, and inclusion (DEI) or used to "promote gender ideology". In response, over 400 artists submitted a letter asking the NEA to reverse these changes. On March 6th Rhode Island Latino Arts, the Theater Offensive, National Queer Theater, and Theater Communications Group sued the NEA, with the American Civil Liberties Union, challenging the requirement to not promote "gender ideology" to apply for NEA grants.

On May 3, 2025, several dozen arts organizations were notified that their grant offers had been terminated, as they did not align with the administration's new priorities. The notifications came on the same day that Trump proposed eliminating the NEA and several other federal agencies.

== Chairpersons ==
- 1965–1969 Roger L. Stevens, appointed by Lyndon B. Johnson
- 1969–1977 Nancy Hanks, appointed by Richard M. Nixon
- 1977–1981 Livingston L. Biddle, Jr., appointed by Jimmy Carter
- 1981–1989 Frank Hodsoll, appointed by Ronald Reagan
- 1989–1992 John Frohnmayer, appointed by George H. W. Bush
- 1993–1997 Jane Alexander, appointed by Bill Clinton
- 1998–2001 Bill Ivey, appointed by Bill Clinton
- 2001-2002 Robert S. Martin, Acting Chairman, appointed by George W. Bush
- 2002 Michael P. Hammond, appointed by George W. Bush
- 2002–2003 Eileen Beth Mason, Acting Chairman, appointed by George W. Bush
- 2003–2009 Dana Gioia, appointed by George W. Bush
- 2009 Patrice Walker Powell, Acting Chairman, appointed by Barack Obama
- 2009–2012 Rocco Landesman, appointed by Barack Obama
- 2012–2014 Joan Shigekawa, Acting Chairman
- 2014–2018 R. Jane Chu, appointed by Barack Obama
- 2019–2021 Mary Anne Carter, appointed by Donald Trump
- 2021–2025 Maria Rosario Jackson, appointed by Joe Biden (resigned January 20, 2025)
- 2025–present Mary Anne Carter, appointed by Donald Trump

=== Nancy Hanks (1969–77) ===
Nancy Hanks, the second chairman, was appointed by President Richard Nixon, continuing her service under Gerald Ford. During her eight-year tenure, the NEA's funding increased from $8 million to $114 million.

According to Elaine A. King:

Nancy Hanks perhaps was able to accomplish her mission because she functioned as a benevolent art dictator rather than mucking with multiple agendas and political red-tape. From 1969 through 1977, under Hanks' administration, the Arts Endowment functioned like a fine piece of oiled machinery. Hanks continuously obtained the requested essential appropriations from Congress because of her genius in implementing the power of the lobby system. Although she had not had direct administrative experience in the federal government, some people were skeptical at the beginning of her term. Those in doubt underestimated her bureaucratic astuteness and her ability to direct this complex cultural office. Richard Nixon's early endorsement of the arts benefited the Arts Endowment in several ways. The budget for the Arts Endowment not only increased but more federal funding became available for numerous programs within the agency.

== See also ==
- List of Ig Nobel Prize winners
- List of U.S. states by per capita arts funding
- National Endowment for the Humanities
- National Heritage Fellowship
- National Medal of Arts winners
- NEA Jazz Masters
- New York City Department of Cultural Affairs
