= Livingston L. Biddle Jr. =

American art historian (1918–2002)

Livingston Ludlow Biddle Jr. (May 26, 1918 – May 3, 2002) was an American author and promoter of funding of the arts, from a wealthy Pennsylvania family.

== Life ==
Livingston Ludlow Biddle was born in Bryn Mawr, Pennsylvania, on May 26, 1918. His mother was Rosalie Eugenia Carter Law and his father was Livingston Ludlow Biddle (1877–1959) of the Biddle family of Philadelphia, who published poems such as "The Understanding Hills". Ancestors included grandfather Edward Biddle (1851–1933) who married Emily Taylor Drexel (1851–1883), daughter of Anthony Joseph Drexel, and great-grandfather Nicholas Biddle (1786–1844), linking to two major banking families. He attended the Montgomery School in Chester Springs, Pennsylvania and St. George's School in Middletown, Rhode Island. He graduated from Princeton University in 1940, majoring in English and French. He was also on the tennis team.

He went to work as a reporter for the Philadelphia Bulletin newspaper until World War II broke out. Several of his cousins and uncles were military leaders, but due to his poor eyesight, he served in the American Field Service as an ambulance driver in Africa. After the war he wrote short stories and four novels set in Philadelphia. From 1963 to 1965 he worked as staff assistant to Senator Claiborne Pell, who was a classmate from both St. George's and Princeton. He helped draft the legislation creating the National Endowment for the Arts (NEA) and the National Endowment for the Humanities. He was appointed by President Jimmy Carter as the third chairman of the NEA in 1977 and served until 1981.

Biddle married Cordelia Fenton who died in 1972. In 1973 he married artist Catharina Baart (1912–2005), who had been born in the Netherlands. She taught art in the Washington, DC public schools from the 1950s to 1974.

He died on May 3, 2002, aged 83.

== Legacy ==
His daughter from his first marriage, Cordelia Frances Biddle (born 1947), also became an author.

== Works ==
- Livingston Biddle Jr. (1949). "The Vacation". The Best American Short Stories and the Yearbook of the American Short Story. Houghton Mifflin Company: 19–35. From Cosmopolitan
- Livingston Biddle (1950). Main Line: a Philadelphia novel. J. Messner.
- Livingston Biddle (1952). Debut. J. Messner.
- Livingston Biddle (1956). The Village Beyond. Lippincott.
- Livingston Biddle (1961). Sam Bentley's Island. Doubleday.
- Livingston Biddle (1988). Our government and the arts: a perspective from the inside. ACA Books. ISBN 978-0-915400-67-6.
