= Tim Miller (performance artist) =

American performance artist and writer (born 1958)

- Born: September 22, 1958 (age 67); Pasadena, California
- Occupations: Performer, writer, performance teacher
- Known for: Performance art
- Spouse: Alistair McCartney
- Website: www.timmillerperformer.com

Tim Miller (born September 22, 1958, in Pasadena, California) is an American performance artist and writer, whose pieces frequently involve gay identity, marriage equality and immigration issues. He was one of the NEA Four, four performance artists whose National Endowment for the Arts grants were vetoed in 1990 by NEA chair John Frohnmayer.

== Life and career ==
Miller was born in Pasadena, California but grew up in nearby Whittier.

He has developed shows based on his personal life as a gay man and as an activist. A member of ACT UP and other campaigning organizations, Miller has participated in numerous demonstrations to call for funding of AIDS research and treatment and to promote equal rights. His civil disobedience has led to his arrest on several occasions.

I was seventeen going on eighteen and I was desperate for love and dick. I searched everywhere for it. I hung around the Whittier Public Library, leaning suggestively against the stacks in the psychology section, waiting to be picked up by some graduate student. I leaned too far, once, and almost knocked over an entire row of bookshelves.

— Tim Miller, "How to Grow Fruit", Boys Like Us: Gay Writers Tell Their Coming Out Stories (1996)

Miller's interest in performance began in high school, where he took classes in theater and dance. He played the lead role of John Proctor in Lowell High School's production of The Crucible by Arthur Miller. At nineteen he moved to New York and studied dance with Merce Cunningham.

In 1980 Miller joined with John Bernd (1953 - 1988), his ex-lover, Charles Dennis, Charles Moulton, and Peter Rose to found P.S. 122, a space for performance art. The name derives from the former school building that houses the project. In 1987 Miller returned to California and with Linda Frye Burnham founded another performance space, Highways, in Santa Monica.

In 1993 Miller was featured in the episode of The Larry Sanders Show called "The Performance Artist". He played himself as the titular performance artist, who appears as a guest both on Larry Sanders' show and on The Tonight Show with Jay Leno performing a portion of My Queer Body.

In 1997 Miller published Shirts & Skin, a compilation of personal stories that he had told in his shows over the previous decade. He also launched a show of the same name.

Miller took on a new topic, immigration rights for gay and lesbian partners of American citizens, in Glory Box (1999). The immigration issue is a personal cause as Alistair McCartney, his partner since 1994, is Australian.

In 2002 Miller published Body Blows, a collection of scripts from six of his shows with associated essays.

Miller returned to the theme of the problems of Americans with same-sex life partners in Us in 2003. The title refers both to his relationship with McCartney and to the laws in the United States which could prevent them from being together.

== Productions ==
Year	Title
1981	Live Boys, created with John Bernd
1982	Postwar
1983	Cost of Living
1984	Democracy in America
1985	Buddy Systems, created with Doug Sadownick
1987	Some Golden States
1989	Stretch Marks
1991	Sex/Love/Stories
1992	My Queer Body
1994	Naked Breath
1996	Fruit Cocktail
1997	Shirts & Skin
1999	Glory Box
2002	Body Blows
2003	Us
2006	1001 Beds
2009	Lay of the Land
