= John Fleck (actor) =

American actor (b. 1951)

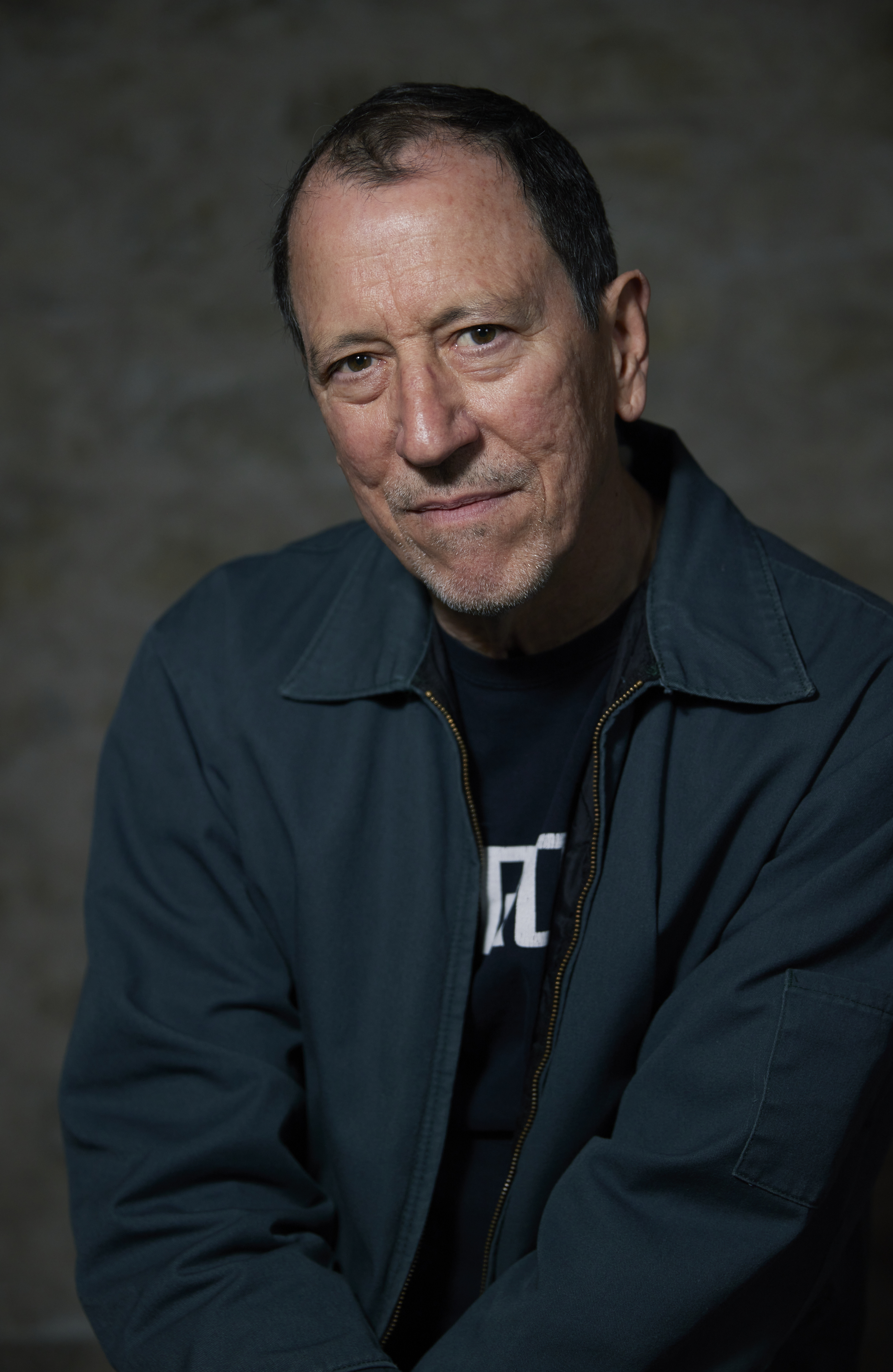
- Fleck at SXSW 2024
- Born: May 7, 1951 (age 74); Cleveland, Ohio, U.S.
- Occupations: Actor, performance artist

John Fleck (born May 7, 1951) is an American actor and performance artist. He has performed in numerous TV shows, including Babylon 5, Carnivàle, Murder One, and the Star Trek franchise. He also appeared in Howard The Duck, Waterworld and the music video for the ZZ Top song "Legs". He made a minor appearance in the Seinfeld episode "The Heart Attack". He played a minor character during the sixth season of Weeds. He wrote and performed "Mad Women" at La MaMa E.T.C.

He is also one of the NEA Four. In 1990 he and three of his fellow artists became embroiled in a lawsuit against the government's National Endowment for the Arts program. John Frohnmayer, one of the chairman of the NEA, vetoed funding his project, a performance comedy with a toilet prop, on the basis of content and was accused of implementing a partisan political agenda. The artists won their case in court in 1993 and were awarded amounts equal to the grant money in question, though the case would make its way to the United States Supreme Court in National Endowment for the Arts v. Finley, which ruled in favour of the NEA's decision-making process.

== Filmography ==
Film
Year	Title	Role	Notes
1982	Truckin' Buddy McCoy	Al	
1985	Hard Rock Zombies	Arnold	
1986	Howard the Duck	Pimples	
1987	Slam Dance	Opera Singer	
1989	Pink Cadillac	Lounge Lizard	
1992	The Comrades of Summer	Milov	
1993	Falling Down	Seedy Guy in Park	
1993	Babylon 5: The Gathering	Del Varner	
1995	Waterworld	Doctor	
1999	Crazy in Alabama	Jake	
2007	Dante's Inferno	Brunetto Latini	voice role
2019	Velvet Buzzsaw	Older Gallery Man	
2019	John Fleck Is Who You Want Him to Be	Himself	Documentary film
2024	Dead Mail	Trent Whittington	

Television
Year	Title	Role	Notes
1985	Hunter	Parolee	Episode: "The Garbage Man"
1987	Cheers	Bailiff	Episode: "Never Love a Goalie: Part 2"
1987	Max Headroom	Ronald	Episode: "The Blanks"
1988	My Two Dads	Nigel Lunch	Episode: "Michael's Sister Comes Over and Visits"
1989	Sweet Bird of Youth	Mission Man	TV movie
1991	Star Trek: The Next Generation	Taibak	Episode: "The Mind's Eye"
1993	Star Trek: Deep Space Nine	Cardassian Overseer	Episode: "The Homecoming"
1994	Star Trek: Deep Space Nine	Ornithar	Episode: "The Search, Part I"
1994	Dream On	Alan	Episode: "Where There's Smoke, You're Fired"
1994	Northern Exposure	Frog	Episode: "Fish Story"
1995–97	Murder One	Louis Hines	Main cast (season 1), recurring role (season 2)
1996	Millennium	Connor	Episode: "Blood Relatives"
1999	Star Trek: Voyager	Abaddon	Episode: "Alice"
1999	Star Trek: Deep Space Nine	Koval	Episode: "Inter Arma Enim Silent Leges"
2000	Just Shoot Me	Dez	Episode: "Blackjack"
2001–04	Star Trek: Enterprise	Silik	8 episodes
2003	Carnivàle	Gecko	Main cast (season 1)
2012	Criminal Minds	Arthur Rykov	Episode: "Through the Looking Glass"
2013	True Blood	Dr. Overlark	5 episodes (season 5)
2015	Backstrom	Dr. Morton Fleck	Episode: "Love Is a Rose and You Better Not Pick It"
2019	The Orville	Ambassador K.T.Z.	Episode: "Blood of Patriots"
2022	The Orville: New Horizons	Krill Ambassador	Episode: "Shadow Realms"
