= John Frohnmayer =

American attorney, writer, and arts leader from Oregon

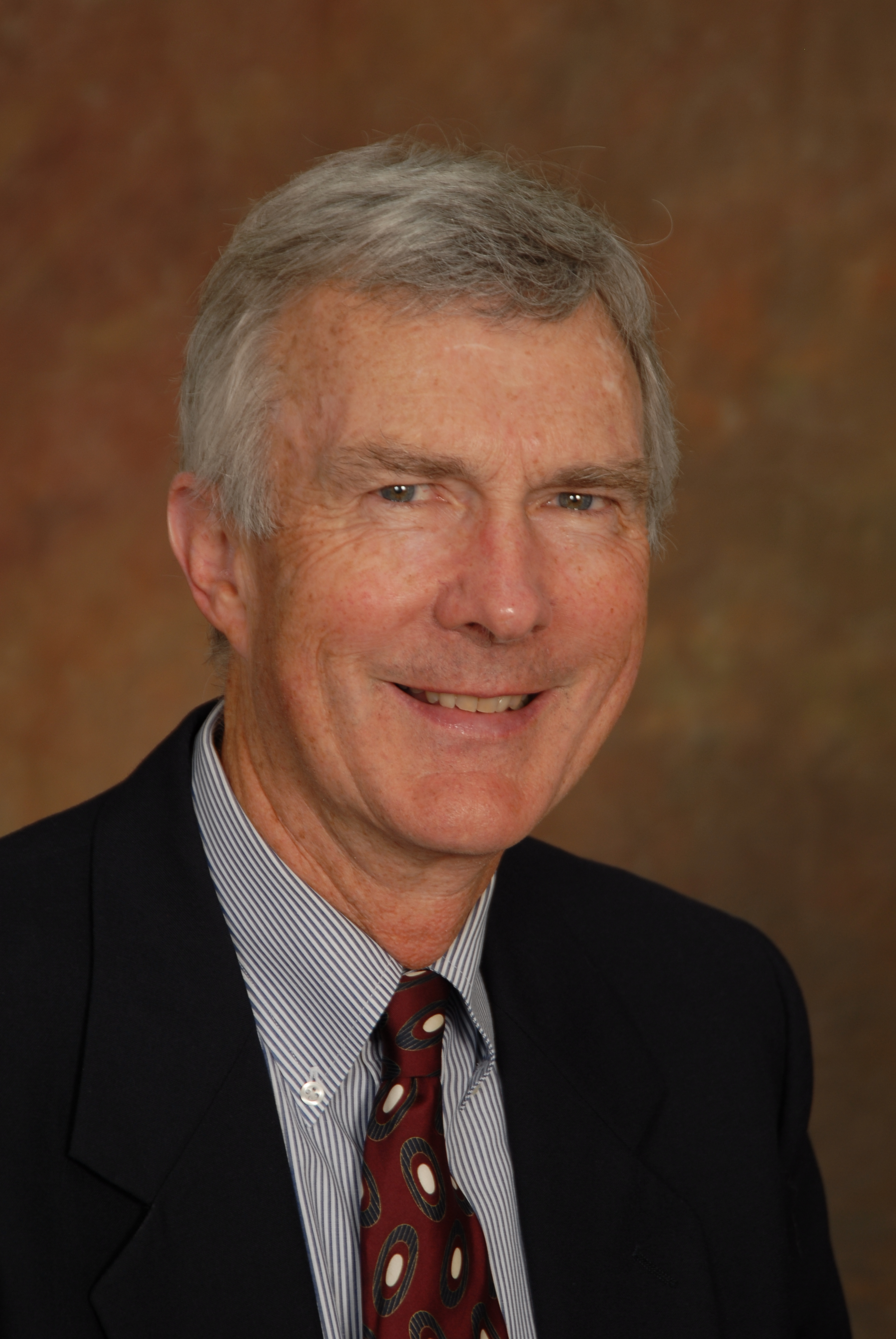
- Born: John Edward Frohnmayer; June 1, 1942 (age 84); Medford, Oregon, U.S.
- Education: Stanford University (BA); University of Chicago (MA); University of Oregon (JD)
- Spouse: Leah Thorpe
- Children: 2
- Relatives: David B. Frohnmayer (brother)
- Military career
- Allegiance: United States
- Branch: United States Navy
- Service years: 1966–1980

John Frohnmayer (born June 1, 1942) is an American writer and retired attorney from the U.S. state of Oregon. He was the fifth chairman of the National Endowment for the Arts, a program of the United States government. He was appointed by President George H. W. Bush in 1989, and served until 1992.

== Early life ==
On June 1, 1942, Frohnmayer was born in Medford, Oregon. Frohnmayer's father was Otto Frohnmayer, a German who immigrated to Oregon in 1906 and an attorney in Oregon. Frohnmayer's mother was MarAbel Braden Frohnmayer, co-founder and the first president of the Rogue Valley Chorale. Frohnmayer has three siblings.

== Education ==
Frohnmayer earned his undergraduate degree from Stanford University, where he sang with the Stanford Mendicants, an a cappella singing group. Later, he earned a master's degree in Christian ethics from the University of Chicago and a J.D. degree from the University of Oregon School of Law, where he was editor-in-chief of the Law Review in 1972.

== Career ==
In 1966, Frohnmayer joined the United States Navy and served as an engineering officer on USS Oklahoma City. In 1980, Frohnmayer retired from the military.

Frohnmayer chaired the Oregon Arts Commission from 1980 to 1984.

President George H. W. Bush appointed Frohnmayer to chair the National Endowment for the Arts in 1989. The NEA was in the midst of controversies surrounding its funding of various projects, notably those of Robert Mapplethorpe, which would lead to Congressional action and a United States Supreme Court decision in 1998, National Endowment for the Arts v. Finley. Frohnmayer's focus on art education was largely overshadowed by the contentious partisan politics surrounding the agency.

Under pressure from the Religious Right, and Pat Buchanan in particular, Frohnmayer resigned in 1992.

Frohnmayer published two books in the 1990s: Leaving Town Alive, an account of his experience at the NEA, and Out of Tune: Listening to the First Amendment, a text for high school and college courses.

Frohnmayer is an Affiliate Professor of Liberal Arts at Oregon State University.

In sports, Frohnmayer is an elite rower with Corvallis Rowing Club in Oregon.

== 2008 U.S. Senate campaign ==
On September 12, 2007, Frohnmayer announced that he would run for the United States Senate representing Oregon, running as a candidate of the Independent Party of Oregon. for the seat formerly held by Republican Gordon Smith. He dropped out of the race on June 10, 2008, citing fundraising problems. Smith lost the Senate election to Jeff Merkley, a Democrat who was cross-nominated by the Independent Party after Frohnmayer quit the race.

== Personal life ==
In 1967, Frohnmayer married Leah Thorpe. They have two sons, Jason and Aaron. Frohnmayer and his family live in Jefferson, Oregon.

== See also ==
- NEA Four
- MarAbel B. Frohnmayer Music Building (named after John's mother)

== Bibliography ==
- Frohnmayer, John (1993). Leaving Town Alive: Confessions of an arts warrior. Houghton Mifflin. ISBN 978-0-395-65571-9.
- Frohnmayer, John (1995). Out of Tune:Listening to the First Amendment. North American Press. ISBN 978-1-55591-932-0.
