= Bus Riders Union =

Bus Riders Union may refer to:

- Bus Riders Union (Los Angeles)
- Bus Riders Union (Vancouver)
