= Astro Artz =

American publishing company

Astro Artz was an American publishing company founded by Susanna Dakin in the early 1980s.

== History ==
The company was most notable for its partnership with High Performance, an art magazine founded by Linda Frye Burnham. In 1980, Dakin met Burnham—who was struggling to keep High Performance afloat at the time—and offered to fund the magazine. Dakin and Burnham then established a publishing partnership, Astro Artz/High Performance, and maintained it for many years.

Apart from High Performance, Astro Artz published many other works such as Art in Everyday Life by Linda Montano, Initiation Dream by Pauline Oliveros and Becky Cohen, The Amazing Decade: Women and Performance Art 1970-1980 edited by Moira Roth, and Dressing Our Wounds in Warm Clothes by Donna Henes.

Astro Artz gained its non-profit, tax-exempt status in 1984 and became eligible to receive grants. In 1988, Dakin purchased a property in Santa Monica that would eventually become the 18th Street Arts Center. Major changes began with the content and direction of High Performance and soon tense relationships developed between the editors and the new Santa Monica board members. High Performance eventually became independent and assets were transferred to Linda Burnham and Steve Durland.

By 1992, Astro Artz had reinstated itself as 18th Street Arts Complex.
