= Syrus Marcus Ware =

Canadian artist, activist and scholar (born 1977)

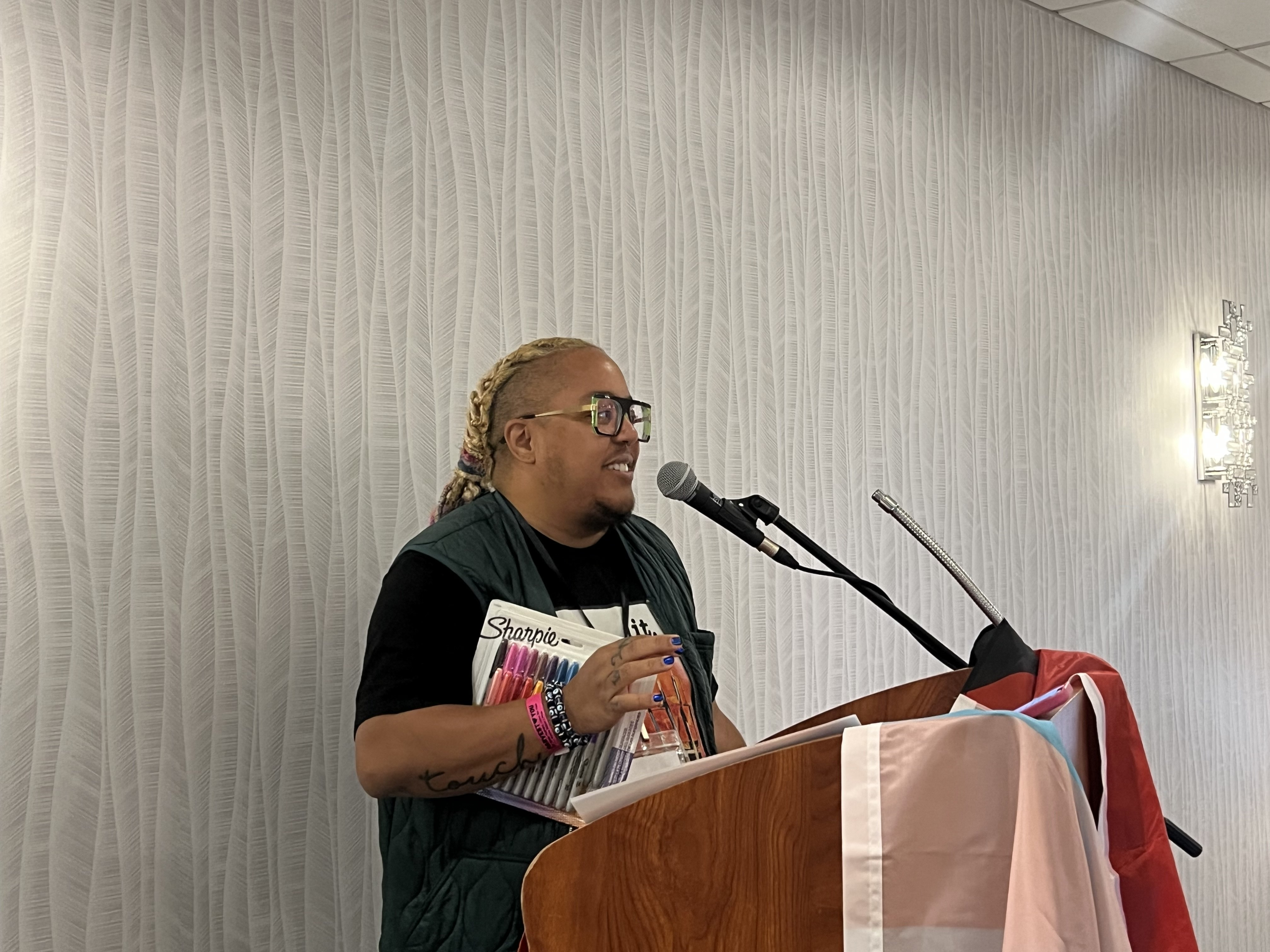
- Ware in 2025
- Born: 1977 (age 48–49); Montreal, Quebec
- Education: BA in Art History, Visual Studies; MA in Sociology and Equity Studies in Education, University of Toronto; PhD in Environmental Studies, York University
- Known for: Visual art
- Awards: Vanier Scholarship; Sylff Fellowship; Steinert & Ferraro Award; TD Diversity Award

Syrus Marcus Ware is a Canadian artist, activist and scholar. He lives and works in Toronto, Ontario and is an assistant professor in the school of the arts at McMaster University. He has worked since 2014 as a faculty member and designer for the Banff Centre. Ware is the inaugural artist-in-residence for the Daniels Spectrum cultural centre in Toronto, and a founding member of Black Lives Matter Toronto. For 13 years, he was the coordinator of the Art Gallery of Ontario's youth program. During that time Ware oversaw the creation of the Free After Three program and the expansion of the youth program.

He has published four books and in 2020 co-edited (with Rodney Diverlus and Sandy Hudson) Until We Are Free: Reflections on Black Lives Matter in Canada, which became a bestseller.

== Early life and education ==
Syrus Marcus Ware was born in Montreal, Quebec and is the twin brother of entomologist Jessica Ware. He attended Etobicoke School of the Arts for high school before transferring to Forest Hill Collegiate Institute. Ware studied art history and visual studies at the University of Toronto and University of British Columbia, earning his honours bachelor's degree in 2002. He studied with Joanne Tod and David Buller. During his studies, he was the coordinator for the Centre for Women and Trans People at the University of Toronto.

Ware began his Masters of Arts in sociology and equity studies in education at the Ontario Institute for Studies in Education in 2006, graduating in 2010. Ware began his PhD in the faculty of environmental studies at York University in 2014 and successfully defended his doctoral thesis in 2021. He is a Sylff fellow and a recipient of a Vanier Canada Graduate Scholarship.

== Career ==
Ware's work explores social justice and Black activist culture through performance, large-scale drawing, installations, paintings and dance. He specifically focuses on issues surrounding gender, sexuality and race.

Ware was selected to be part of the Toronto Biennial of Art's 2019 and 2022 exhibitions. At the 2019 Biennial, he created Antarctica, a performance and interactive installation about white supremacy and climate change and Ancestors, Do You Read Us: Dispatches From The Future, an 8-channel video work created with Mishann Lau and set in 2072 in a world where Black and Indigenous people have survived climate change and race wars. His work has been shown at the Sydney Festival, the Art Gallery of Burlington, the Art Gallery of Ontario, the Art Gallery of Windsor, the University of Lethbridge Art Gallery, the Gladstone Hotel, and the Art Gallery of York University.

In 2021, Ware was commissioned to write a new play, Emmett, for Obsidian Theatre and CBC Gem. The play is set in a near but different future and follows the protagonist, Medgar (a reimagined Medgar Evers), on a day when everything changes. The performance was filmed in Toronto in 2021 and features actor Prince Amponsah. Directed by Tanisha Taitt, the production was broadcast on CBC Gem on February 12, 2021.

=== Community radio ===
For 17 years, Ware was the host of Resistance on the Sound Dial, a community radio show on CIUT FM. In the show he combined activist music with political interviews and conversations with activists and artists, including Octavia E. Butler, Georgina Beyer, Ursula Rucker, Tumi and the Volume and Bob Moses. He also participated in other shows on the station including Wench Radio, Radio OPIRG and By All Means.

== Activism ==
Ware is a long-time abolitionist. He was a core team member of Black Lives Matter Toronto. He is a co-founder of Black Lives Matter Canada and the Wildseed Centre for Art and Activism. Ware collaborated with Blackness Yes! for 19 years in order to create events like the trans and Black stage at Pride Toronto called Blockorama. Ware is also one of the founding members of both the Toronto-based Prison Justice Action Committee and the Gay/Bi Trans Men's HIV Prevention Working Group, which created "Primed: the Back Pocket Guide for Trans Guys and the Guys who Dig em", the first ever sexual health resource for trans men who have sex with men in the world. He also helped to create Trans-Fathers 2B, the first course for trans men considering parenting in North America, based in The 519. He sits on the board of the Tegan and Sara Foundation.

Ware has stated that his intent is to dismantle white supremacy within the arts and diversify the museum field.

== Awards and honors ==
NOW Magazine awarded Ware the Best Queer Activist award in 2005. He received the TD Diversity Award in 2017. He was awarded the Min Sook Lee Labour Arts Award from the Mayworks Festival in 2017. Ware is a Vanier Scholar and a Sylff Fellow.

In 2012, he received the Steinert & Ferreiro Award for LGBTQ activism.

== Bibliography ==
=== As editor ===
- Queering Urban Justice: Queer of Colour Formations in Toronto (2018, University of Toronto Press, with Jin Haritaworn, Ghaida Moussa and Río Rodríguez)
- Marvellous Grounds: Queer of Colour Histories of Toronto (2018, Between the Lines Books, with Jin Haritaworn and Ghaida Moussa)
- Until We Are Free: Reflections on Black Lives Matter in Canada (2020, University of Regina Press, with Rodney Diverlus and Sandy Hudson)

=== As author ===
- Abolition is Love (2023, Seven Stories Press, illustrated by Alannah Fricker)
- Love is in the Hair (2015, Flamingo Rampant Press, also as illustrator)

=== As illustrator ===
- Bridge of Flowers (2018, Flamingo Rampant Press, written by Leah Lakshmi Piepzna-Samarasinha)
- I Promise (2019, Arsenal Pulp Press, written by Catherine Hernandez)

=== Articles ===
- "Activating Diversity and Inclusion: A Blueprint for Museum Educators as Allies and Change Makers." With Wendy Ng and Alyssa Greenberg. Journal of Museum Education, vol. 42, no. 2 (2017), pp. 142–154.
- "Foraging the Future: Forest Baths, Engaged Pedagogy, and Planting Ourselves Into the Future." Qualitative Inquiry, vol. 28, no. 2 (2022), pp. 236–243.
- "We want abolition in our lifetime." THIS (2020).
