= Scott Parsons (artist) =

American contemporary artist

- Born: 1964 (age 61–62)

Scott Parsons (born 1964) is an American contemporary artist whose work encompasses architectural art glass and site-specific public art installations. His work has been discussed in scholarship on public art, place-based practice, and contemporary stained glass, including scholarship examining issues of locality, civic meaning, and abstraction in late twentieth- and early twenty-first-century American art.

Parsons has completed numerous permanent public art commissions in the United States and Canada, including works for major transportation hubs and civic institutions. His projects have been documented in publications such as Art in America, Architectural Record, and Stained Glass.

== Critical reception ==
Parsons’ work has been characterized by critics as drawing on natural forms, environmental patterns, and contemporary graphic design, often translated into abstract compositions in glass, mosaic, and architectural terrazzo. Writing in Faith & Form, Kenneth von Roenn describes Parsons’ stained-glass projects as representing a departure from traditional ecclesiastical iconography toward layered, abstract imagery emphasizing color, structure, and spatial experience. In Stained Glass, von Roenn situates Parsons’ work within a contemporary revival of the medium that engages architectural context and modern visual language.

Several commentators have noted the role of place and regional experience in Parsons’ work. Writing in Art Papers, Joe Miller links Parsons’ visual vocabulary to his upbringing in Colorado, identifying a sustained engagement with landscape and memory across his projects.

Parsons’ early public artwork Reconciliation Project (1992) has been discussed as an example of emerging counter-memorial practices in American public art. Writing in High Performance, Denise Uyehara situates the work within a broader movement away from didactic monuments toward forms emphasizing reflection and collective experience. Deborah Karasov later referenced the project in Public Art Review as part of a growing body of elegiac public artworks that evoke emotional and sensory connections to place rather than fixed historical narratives.

Parsons’ religious and sacred architecture projects have also received attention within field-specific publications. His work has received recognition in Faith & Form, a journal documenting contemporary religious art and architecture.

== Public art and institutional commissions ==
Parsons has produced permanent public artworks for a range of civic and institutional settings. His work is installed at the Minneapolis–St. Paul International Airport, Charlotte Douglas International Airport, Orlando International Airport, and Fort Lauderdale–Hollywood International Airport, as well as at university and ecclesiastical sites. Coverage of these projects has appeared in newspapers including the Orlando Sentinel, the Argus Leader, and The Denver Post.
