= Adolfo V. Nodal =

Cuban-American arts administrator

Adolfo V. Nodal (born 1950, Guaos, Cuba) is a Cuban-American arts administrator, cultural producer, and preservationist based in Los Angeles, California. He served as General Manager of the City of Los Angeles Department of Cultural Affairs (DCA) from 1988 to 2001, one of the longest tenures in the Department's history.

== Early life and education ==
Nodal was born in 1950 in Guaos, Cuba, and immigrated to Miami, Florida, with his family as a child. He earned a Bachelor of Arts in art from Florida State University in 1972 and a Master of Arts in Contemporary Art from California State University, San Francisco. In 1981, he received a certificate in Museum Management from the Art Museum Association Museum Management Institute.

== Career ==
=== Early career and MacArthur Park ===
Nodal served as executive director of the Washington Project for the Arts in Washington, D.C. (1978–1983), the Otis Parsons School of Art Exhibition Center in Los Angeles (1983–1987), and the Contemporary Arts Center of New Orleans.

While at the Washington Project for the Arts, Nodal was a founding member of the steering committee that drafted the plan for the National Association of Artists' Organizations (NAAO), a national service organization for artist-run alternative spaces that later played a central role in defending artistic freedom during the culture wars.

At Otis Parsons, Nodal spearheaded the MacArthur Park Public Art Program, renovating the park's band shell and commissioning public art to revitalize the neighborhood, a project documented in his book MacArthur Park: How the Arts Made a Difference (1990).

=== General Manager, Department of Cultural Affairs (1988–2001) ===
In 1988, Los Angeles Mayor Tom Bradley appointed Nodal as General Manager of the Department of Cultural Affairs, a position he held for twelve years.

=== Defense of artistic freedom ===
During the culture wars of the early 1990s, Nodal worked with City Councilmember Joel Wachs to resist federal censorship efforts led by Senator Jesse Helms. Nodal helped draft city policy that protected artists from "decency" requirements, ensuring Los Angeles remained a sanctuary for controversial or avant-garde work. This effort culminated in the City of Los Angeles Individual Artists (COLA) grants, which fund artists based purely on merit.

=== Infrastructure and capital projects ===
Working with Mayor Tom Bradley and Council member Joel Wachs, Nodal helped establish the Los Angeles Arts Endowment beginning in 1988, creating a structural funding foundation for the city's cultural programs. He developed a cultural master plan for the city, created a citywide annual festival program, and channeled increased funding into the city's mural program.

Nodal served as General Manager of the Department of Cultural Affairs during the final years of Merry Norris's transformative presidency of the Cultural Affairs Commission (1984–1990), partnering with Norris on the implementation of the commission's elevated civic design standards which he maintained while during his tenure as Commission President.

Under his leadership, DCA established the Percent for Public Art program on two tracks: one applying to city capital projects and a separate Private Arts Development Fee applying to private real estate development citywide. Nodal's tenure saw a massive expansion of LA's cultural footprint, including:

- Barnsdall Art Park: Overseeing the restoration of Frank Lloyd Wright's Hollyhock House.
- Warner Grand Theatre: Facilitating the city's acquisition of the historic San Pedro venue in 1996, which Nodal transitioned into a city-operated performing arts center.
- Mariachi Plaza: Developing the cultural hub in Boyle Heights, which has served as a center for mariachi music and community festivals since 1989.

== Neon preservation ==
=== LUMENS ===
Nodal founded the LUMENS Project to restore historic neon signs, relighting over 150 signs including the Hollywood Roosevelt Hotel and the United Artists Building. In 2022, he produced the "Heart of Los Angeles" neon installation at the 3rd Street Tunnel.

=== Habana Light Neon + Signs ===
Building on his experience with the LUMENS project in Los Angeles, Nodal co-founded Habana Light Neon + Signs. This initiative focuses on the restoration of Havana's dormant vintage neon signs, which had fallen into disrepair over decades. The project operates as a community-based workshop that trains local Cuban artisans in the craft of neon tube bending and transformer repair. Notable restorations include the iconic neon for the **Teatro America** and several historic cinema and cabaret signs in the Vedado and Habana Vieja districts.

== U.S.–Cuba cultural exchange ==
Nodal has been a prominent figure in fostering cultural ties between the United States and Cuba for over three decades. He co-founded and produced the **Presencia Cubana Festival** in Echo Park, which celebrated Cuban music, dance, and art in Southern California for over 20 years.

In 2003, he published Memoria: Cuban Art of the Twentieth Century, a comprehensive survey of the island's artistic heritage. Following the easing of travel restrictions, Nodal became a partner at **Project Por Amor**, a Los Angeles–based organization that facilitates culturally immersive travel and professional exchange between American and Cuban artists and scholars.

== Recognition ==
Nodal was named one of Washingtonian magazine's Washingtonians of the Year in 1981 in recognition of his leadership of the Washington Project for the Arts. In 2000, the Government of Brazil conferred upon him the National Order of the Southern Cross (Ordem Nacional do Cruzeiro do Sul), the country's preeminent decoration for foreign nationals, established by Emperor Pedro I in 1822 and awarded by presidential decree for distinguished service to the Brazilian nation.

== Affiliations ==
- Founding member, National Association of Artists' Organizations (NAAO)
- Trustee, Americans for the Arts
- Founding member, LA Works and LA Shares

== Selected works ==
- MacArthur Park: How the Arts Made a Difference. Hennessey & Ingalls, 1990. ISBN 978-0-912158-96-9.
- Memoria: Cuban Art of the Twentieth Century. California International Arts Foundation, 2003.

== See also ==
- Culture of Los Angeles
- Cuban art
- Museum of Neon Art
- Percent for Art
