= National Association of Artists' Organizations =

The National Association of Artists' Organizations (NAAO) was, from 1982 through the early 2000s, a Washington, D.C.–based arts service organization which, at its height, had a constituency of over 700 artists' organizations, arts institutions, artists and arts professionals representing a cross-section of diverse aesthetics, geographic, economic, ethnic and gender-based communities especially inclusive of the creators of emerging and experimental work in the interdisciplinary, literary, media, performing and visual arts. At the apex of its activities, in the late 1980s and early 1990s, NAAO served as a catalyst and co-plaintiff on the Supreme Court case, National Endowment for the Arts v. Finley having spawned the National Campaign for Freedom of Expression. NAAO's dormancy in the early years of the 21st century led to the formation of Common Field.

NAAO emerged from the New Artpace conference and attendee directory held in 1978 at the Miramar Hotel in Santa Monica, California. The National Endowment for the Arts (NEA) began funding artists' organizations, artist-run alternative spaces and artist-driven initiatives in 1973 when an extension of the Works Progress Administration (WPA), the Comprehensive Employment and Training Act (CETA), began training and supporting jobs for artists working at these sites. The NEA's Visual Arts Program supported the formation of NAAO to provide networking opportunities (national conferences and membership directories) to this emergent constituency.

NAAO led the nation into the culture wars of the early 1990s by responding rapidly and pro-actively through its national network of community-based arts and cultural spaces to Congressional attacks against artists' rights and freedom of expression. These attacks included the ripping of images of Andre Serrano's Piss Christ on the floor of Congress, and led to the Corcoran Gallery of Art's summer of 1989 decision to cancel the exhibition The Perfect Moment, a retrospective of works by photographer Robert Mapplethorpe. These attacks led to other incidents of arts censorship across the country, the inclusion of a "decency clause" authored by Senator Jesse Helms (R-NC) written into the grant guidelines of the National Endowment for the Arts and the cancellation of NEA grants due to content restrictions.

NAAO staff members in chronological order from its founding in 1982 were: Claire Copley, executive director; Robin Drummond, DC office coordinator; Charlotte R. Murphy, volunteer, office assistant, executive director; Rebecca Krafft, NAAO Bulletin editor; Susan Born Ozment, membership coordinator; Gail Mishkin, conference coordinator; Jane Bedula, editor; Jan Ellenstein, conference coordinator; Penny Boyer, assistant director, associate director; Mary Drayton-Hill, development coordinator; Chris Westberg, NAAO Bulletin contributing editor, membership coordinator; Adelle Biancarelli, bookkeeper; Victoria Reis, intern, administrative assistant; Jennifer Woods, administrative assistant; Helen Brunner, interim executive director, executive director; Roberto Bedoya, executive director

NAAO member organizations in 1992, as published in Organizing Artists: A Document and Directory of the National Association of Artists' Organizations, were:

Organizations based in the United States
Name	State	Location
1708 East Main	Virginia	Richmond
1708 Gallery	California	Chico
911 Media Arts Center	Washington	Seattle
ABC No Rio	New York	New York City
Acme Art Company	Ohio	Columbus
Adaptors Inc.	New York	New York City
A.I.R. Gallery	New York	New York City
Aleph Movement Theatre, Inc.	Montana	Helena
Aljira, a Center for Contemporary Art	New Jersey	Newark
Alliance for the Arts	New York	New York City
Alliance for Cultural Democracy	Minnesota	Minneapolis
Alliance of Resident Theatres	New York	New York City
Allied Productions, Inc.	New York	New York City
Alternate ROOTS	Georgia	Atlanta
The Alternative Museum	New York	New York City
Alternative Worksite	Nebraska	Omaha
American Society of Furniture Artists	Texas	Houston
Appalshop	Kentucky	Whitesburg
Arizona Commission on the Arts	Arizona	Phoenix
Arlington Arts Center	Virginia	Arlington
Armory Center for the Arts	California	Pasadena
Art Attack International, Inc.	New York	New York City
Art Emergency Coalition	Pennsylvania	Philadelphia
Art in General	New York	New York City
Art Matters	New York	New York City
Art on the Tracks	Florida	Pensacola
Art Papers	Georgia	Atlanta
Art Resources International	N/A	Washington, D.C.
The Art Studio, Inc.	Texas	Beaumont
ARTCALENDAR	Virginia	Great Falls
Artemisia Gallery	Illinois	Chicago
Artifacts Artist Group	Florida	Miami Beach
Artifex Alternative Arts Museum	Minnesota	Minneapolis
Artist Trust	Washington	Seattle
Artists for a Better Image	Maryland	Baltimore
Artists Alliance	Louisiana	Lafayette
Artists Space	New York	New York City
Artists Talk on Art	New York	New York City
Artists Television Access	California	San Francisco
Artlink, Inc.	Arizona	Phoenix
Arts Center Gallery	Illinois	Glen Ellyn
The Arts Exchange	Georgia	Atlanta
Arts Midwest	Minnesota	Minneapolis
Arts on the Park	Florida	Lakeland
Artspace	Virginia	Richmond
Artspace, Inc.	North Carolina	Raleigh
Artswatch	Kentucky	Louisville
Asian American Arts Centre	New York	New York City
Association of Performing Arts Presenters	N/A	Washington, D.C.
Astro Artz	California	Santa Monica
Atlanta Theatre Coalition	Georgia	Atlanta
ATLATL	Arizona	Phoenix
Baltimore Clayworks	Maryland	Baltimore
Bay Area Video Coalition	California	San Francisco
Bayfront NATO Center for the Arts	Pennsylvania	Erie
Beacon Street Gallery & Theatre	Illinois	Chicago
Beyond Baroque	California	Venice
Birmingham Art Association	Alabama	Birmingham
Blue Rider Theatre	Illinois	Chicago
Blue Star Art Space	Texas	San Antonio
Boston Center for the Arts	Massachusetts	Boston
Boulder Art Center	Colorado	Boulder
Bridge Center for Contemporary Art	Texas	El Paso
Buckham Gallery	Michigan	Flint
Cactus Foundation	California	Los Angeles
California Confederation of the Arts	California	Sacramento
Capp Street Project	California	San Francisco
Case Western University Arts Management Program	Ohio	Cleveland
Center for Arts Criticism	Minnesota	St. Paul
Center for Contemporary Arts of Santa Fe	New Mexico	Santa Fe
Center for Exploratory & Perceptual Art	New York	Buffalo
Center for Photography at Woodstock	New York	Woodstock
Center for Tapestry Arts, Inc.	New York	New York City
Centro Cultural de la Raza	California	San Diego
Centro de Arte	N/A	Washington, D.C.
Chicago Artists' Coalition	Illinois	Chicago
Cleveland Performance Art Festival	Ohio	Cleveland
Coalition of Washington Artists	N/A	Washington, D.C.
Coastal Arts League Museum	California	Half Moon Bay
Center on Contemporary Art	Washington	Seattle
Cincinnati Artists' Group Effort	Ohio	Cincinnati
College Art Association	New York	New York City
Contemporary Art Institute of Detroit	Michigan	Detroit
Contemporary Arts Center	Louisiana	New Orleans
COSACOSA Art At Large, Inc.	Pennsylvania	Philadelphia
Craft Emergency Relief Fund	Massachusetts	Shelburne Falls
CRASHarts	Arizona	Phoenix
Creative Time	New York	New York City
CSPS	Iowa	Cedar Rapids
Dance Bay Area	California	San Francisco
Dance Place	N/A	Washington, D.C.
Dance Theater Workshop	New York	New York City
Dance Umbrella	Texas	Austin
Danforth Gallery	Oregan	Portland
Dallas Artists Research & Exhibition	Texas	Dallas
Delaware Center for the Contemporary Arts	Delaware	Wilmington
Delaware State Arts Council	Delaware	Wilmington
Delta Axis	Tennessee	Memphis
Detroit Artists Market	Michigan	Detroit
Detroit Focus Gallery	Michigan	Detroit
Dialogue, Inc.	Ohio	Columbus
Dick Shea's Performance Space and Barefoot Ballroom	New York	New York City
Dinnerware Artists' Cooperative Gallery	Arizona	Tucson
District of Columbia Art Center, Inc.	N/A	Washington, D.C.
DiverseWorks	Texas	Houston
Dixon Place	New York	New York City
Dover Art League	Delaware	Dover
Enabled Artists United	California	Dobbins
Exit Art	New York	New York City
Experimental Intermedia	New York	New York City
Exploratorium	California	San Francisco
Eye Gallery	California	San Francisco
The Fabric Workshop	Pennsylvania	Philadelphia
Film Arts Foundation	California	San Francisco
Footwork/Dancer's Group Inc.	California	San Francisco
Forum Gallery	New York	Jamestown
Foundation for Arts Resources	California	Los Angeles
Foundation for Today's Art	Pennsylvania	Philadelphia
Franklin Furnace Archive, Inc.	New York	New York City
Friends of the Hispanic Community	Wisconsin	Milwaukee
Full Circle Dance Co.	N/A	Washington, D.C.
Fullerton Museum Center	California	Fullerton
Galeria de la Raza	California	San Francisco
Gallery Route One	California	Pt Reyes Station
Godzilla	New York	New York City
Gran Fury	New York	New York City
Guerrilla Girls	New York	New York City
Hairpin Arts Center	Illinois	Chicago
Hallwalls Contemporary Arts Center	New York	Buffalo
Hand Workshop	Virginia	Richmond
Harvestworks, Inc.	New York	New York City
Hatley Martin Cultural Forum	California	San Francisco
Headlands Center for the Arts	California	Sausalito
Helena Presents	Montana	Helena
Henry Street Settlement	New York	New York City
Hera Educational Foundation	Rhode Island	Wakefield
Heresies	New York	New York City
Highways Performance Space	California	Santa Monica
Hillwood Art Museum	New York	Brookville
Hopkins Center for the Arts	New Hampshire	Hanover
Houston Center for Photography	Texas	Houston
Howard County Center for the Arts	Maryland	Ellicott City
Huntington Beach Art Center	California	Huntington Beach
Illinois Arts Council	Illinois	Chicago
Images Center for Photography	Ohio	Cincinnati
Individual Artists of Oklahoma	Oklahoma	Oklahoma City
Installation	California	San Diego
INTAR (International Arts Relations, Inc.)	New York	New York City
Intermedia Arts Minnesota	Minnesota	Minneapolis
International Friends of Transformative Arts	Arizona	Scottsdale
Intersection for the Arts	California	San Francisco
Jacob's Pillow Dance Festival & School	Massachusetts	Becket
John Michael Kohler Arts Center	Wisconsin	Sheboygan
Jump-Start Performance Co.	Texas	San Antonio
Just Buffalo Literary Center	New York	Buffalo
Kala Institute	California	Berkeley
Kansas City Artists Coalition	Montana	Kansas City
Kirkland Art Center	New York	Clinton
Kirkland Arts Center	Washington	Kirkland
KO Theatre Works, Inc.	Massachusetts	Amherst
La Napoule Art Foundation	New York	New York City
The Lab	California	San Francisco
Landmark Art Projects	California	La Jolla
Lawndale Art Center	Texas	Houston
Laziza Videodance & Lumia Project	New York	New York City
Life on the Water	California	San Francisco
The Light Factory	North Carolina	Charlotte
Light Work	New York	Syracuse
The Loft	Minnesota	Minneapolis
Loft Theatre	Florida	Tampa
Los Angeles Center for Photographic Studies	California	Los Angeles
Los Angeles Contemporary Exhibitions	California	Los Angeles
Los Angeles Poverty Department	California	Los Angeles
Louisville Visual Art Association	Kentucky	Louisville
Lower East Side Printshop, Inc.	New York	New York City
Lower Manhattan Cultural Council	New York	New York City
Management Consultants for the Arts	Connecticut	Cos Cob
MARS Artspace	Arizona	Phoenix
Mary Street Dance Theatre	Florida	Miami
Maryland Art Place	Maryland	Baltimore
Mexic-Arte Museum	Texas	Austin
Mid-America Arts Alliance	Montana	Kansas City
Mid Atlantic Arts Foundation	Maryland	Baltimore
Minnesota Artists Exhibition Program	Minnesota	Minneapolis
Mobius Artists Group	Massachusetts	Boston
MoMA PS1	New York	New York City
Movement Research	New York	New York City
N.A.M.E.	Illinois	Chicago
Nathan Cummings Foundation	New York	New York City
National Alliance of Media Art Centers	California	Oakland
National Artists Equity Association	N/A	Washington, D.C.
National Council on Education for the Ceramic Arts	Oregan	Bandon
National Jazz Service Organization	N/A	Washington, D.C.
Near Northwest Arts Council	Illinois	Chicago
Nevada State Council on the Arts	Nevada	Reno
New Arts Program	Pennsylvania	Kutztown
New England Foundation for the Arts	Massachusetts	Cambridge
New Harmony Gallery of Contemporary Art	Indiana	New Harmony
New Langton Arts	California	San Francisco
New Organization for the Visual Arts	Ohio	Cleveland
New Visions Art Gallery	Georgia	Atlanta
New York Experimental Glass Workshop	New York	New York City
New York Foundation for the Arts	New York	New York City
Nexus Contemporary Art Center	Georgia	Atlanta
Ohio Arts Council	Ohio	Columbus
OhioDance	Ohio	Columbus
Oklahoma Visual Arts Coalition, Inc.	Oklahoma	Oklahoma City
On the Boards	Washington	Seattle
Organization of Independent Artists	New York	New York City
Painted Bride Art Center	Pennsylvania	Philadelphia
Painting Space 122, Inc.	New York	New York City
Pentacle	New York	New York City
Performance Space 122	New York	New York City
Philadelphia Independent Film and Video Association	Pennsylvania	Philadelphia
Photographic Resource Center	Massachusetts	Boston
Ping Chong & Company	New York	New York City
Pittsburgh Filmmakers	Pennsylvania	Pittsburgh
Polarities	Massachusetts	Brookline
Printed Matter, Inc.	New York	New York City
Pro Arts	California	Oakland
Public Art Fund, Inc.	New York	New York City
Public Art Works	California	San Rafael
Public Library of Cincinnati & Hamilton County	Ohio	Cincinnati
Pyramid Arts Center, Inc.	New York	Rochester
Pyramid Atlantic Art Center	Maryland	Riverdale
Rachel Rosenthal Company	California	Los Angeles
Radical Arts Trajectory	California	San Francisco
Randolph Street Gallery	Illinois	Chicago
Real Art Ways	Connecticut	Hartford
Reflex	Washington	Seattle
Resources & Counseling for the Arts	Minnesota	Saint Paul
Rosenberg Gallery at Goucher College	Maryland	Baltimore
Rotunda Gallery	New York	New York City
Roulette Intermedia, Inc.	New York	New York City
San Francisco Art Institute	California	San Francisco
San Francisco Arts Commission Gallery	California	San Francisco
San Francisco Camerawork	California	San Francisco
San Jose Institute of Contemporary Art	California	San Jose
Santa Barbara Contemporary Arts Forum	California	Santa Barbara
Santa Monica Museum of Art	California	Santa Monica
School 33 Art Center	Maryland	Baltimore
School of the Art Institute of Chicago	Illinois	Chicago
Sculpture Space, Inc.	New York	Utica
Second Street Gallery	Virginia	Charlottesville
Seven Stages	Georgia	Atlanta
Several Dancers Core	Georgia	Decatur
Skowhegan School of Painting and Sculpture	Michigan	Skowhegan
Snug Harbor Cultural Center	New York	Staten Island
Social and Public Art Resource Center	California	Venice
Soundwork Northwest	Washington	Seattle
Southend Musicworks	Illinois	Chicago
Southern Arts Federation	Georgia	Atlanta
Southern Exposure Gallery	California	San Francisco
The Southern Theater	Minnesota	Minneapolis
Southwest Craft Center	Texas	San Antonio
The Space	Massachusetts	Boston
Space One Eleven	Alabama	Birmingham
SPACES	Ohio	Cleveland
Spirit Square	North Carolina	Charlotte
Split Rock Arts Program	Minnesota	Minneapolis
Squeaky Wheel Buffalo Media Arts Center	New York	Buffalo
Studio Potter Network	New Hampshire	Exeter
Sushi Performance & Visual Art	California	San Diego
Texas Fine Arts Association	Texas	Austin
Tigertail Productions	Florida	Miami
Touchstone Center for Crafts	Pennsylvania	Uniontown
Tulsa Artists Coalition	Oklahoma	Tulsa
Tulsa Photography Collective	Oklahoma	Tulsa
University Art Museum and Pacific Film Archive	California	Berkeley
The Urban Institute for Contemporary Arts	Michigan	Grand Rapids
Video Data Bank	Illinois	Chicago
Visual AIDS	New York	New York City
Visual Arts Center of Alaska	Alaska	Anchorage
Visual Arts Information Service	Minnesota	St. Paul
Visual Studies Workshop	New York	Rochester
Volcano Art Center	Hawaii	Hawaii National Park
Vortex Repertory Company	Texas	Austin
Walker Art Center	Minnesota	Minneapolis
Walker's Point Center for the Arts	Wisconsin	Milwaukee
Washington Center for Photography	N/A	Washington, D.C.
Washington Project for the Arts	N/A	Washington, D.C.
Washington Sculptors Group	Maryland	Berwyn Heights
Wexner Center for the Arts	Ohio	Columbus
White Columns	New York	New York City
WhiteWalls	Illinois	Chicago
Women & Their Work	Texas	Austin
Women's Art Registry of Minnesota	Minnesota	Saint Paul
X-Communication	New York	New York City
Yellow Springs Institute	Pennsylvania	Chester Springs
Zone	Massachusetts	Springfield

Organizations based in Canada
Name	Province	Location
Association of National Non-Profit Artists' Centres	Ontario	Toronto
Musee D’Art Contemporain de Montreal	Quebec	Montreal
