= Patrisse Cullors =

American artist and activist (born 1983)

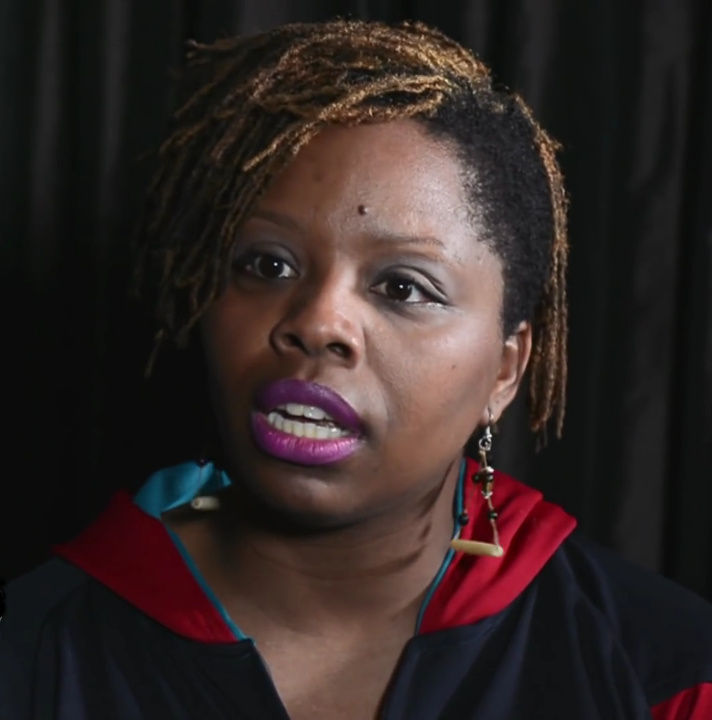
- Cullors in 2015
- Born: Patrisse Cullors; June 20, 1983 (age 43); Los Angeles, California, U.S.
- Education: University of California, Los Angeles (BA); University of Southern California (MFA)
- Occupations: Activist, artist, writer
- Notable work: Black Lives Matter
- Spouse: Janaya Khan (m. 2016) (Note: In April 2022, a statement by Khan's spokesperson claimed that they had separated in 2017. However, a February 2022 story by The Guardian reported that they were living together.)
- Children: 1

Patrisse Marie Khan-Cullors Brignac (née Cullors-Brignac; born June 20, 1983) is an American progressive activist, artist, and writer who co-founded the Black Lives Matter movement. Cullors created the #BlackLivesMatter hashtag in 2013 and has written and spoken widely about the movement.

Other topics on which Cullors advocates include prison abolition in Los Angeles and LGBTQ rights. Cullors integrates ideas from critical theory in her activism. She has been the subject of criticism for her personal spending and handling of Black Lives Matter funding.

== Early life and education ==
Cullors was born in Los Angeles, California. Her mother Cherice Foley is a Jehovah's Witness. Her biological father was Gabriel Brignac, whom she did not meet until she was eleven years old. She was raised in the home of Alton Cullors, who used to work at a General Motors plant in Van Nuys before it was shut down, forcing him to work in low-paying jobs. She has three siblings: Two brothers named Paul and Monte, and a sister named Jasmine. Gabriel was a repeat offender who was jailed many times on drugs-related charges and died in 2009 in a homeless shelter. Cullors described him as having a constant and caring presence in her life.

Her brother, Monte was arrested in 1999 after stealing his mother's car. Later he was diagnosed with schizoaffective disorder and bipolar disorder. Cullors recalled that in a fight with prison officers, he was allegedly choked, beaten up brutally, and was forced to drink toilet water. She has cited this as one of the reasons for her activism.

Cullors grew up in a Section 8 apartment in Van Nuys, a poor and largely Mexican-American neighborhood in the San Fernando Valley. Her step-father Alton eventually left his family, leaving Cherice to raise her kids on her own. Cullors said that she witnessed her 11 and 13-year-old brothers being needlessly slammed into a wall by police when she was 9 years old. At the age of 12, she was arrested for smoking marijuana. At this time, she was a student at Millikan Middle School, an affluent school in Sherman Oaks which had a large white student body and a population of gifted students. Cullors describes that she felt ashamed going there with her mother in a car. She also states that it was the white girls at the school who introduced her to weed. However, when she was arrested, she was attending the Van Nuys Middle School, a school consisting mostly of children of working-class families and non-whites, as part of summer school, due to her poor grades. For her, the transition was a shock, as the school had a metal detector and was guarded by police unlike her other school.

Cullors became an activist early in life, joining the Bus Riders Union (BRU) under the leadership of Eric Mann as a teenager during which time she attended a year-long organizing program led by the Labor Community Strategy Center (which organized the BRU). She learned about revolutionaries, critical theory and social movements from around the world, while practicing activism. Cullors also enrolled at Grover Cleveland High School (now Cleveland Humanities Magnet) in Reseda and was admitted into its social justice magnet program. She went onto acquire a degree in religion and philosophy at UCLA, as well as a MFA from the Roski School of Art and Design at the University of Southern California.

Cullors recalled being forced from her home at sixteen when she revealed her queer identity to her parents. Raised as a Jehovah's Witness, but due to her mother's teenage pregnancy, Cullors' immediate family was shunned by both the church and their extended family members; she remained committed to the faith for years, even in exile, but later grew disillusioned with the church. She developed an interest in the Nigerian religious tradition of Ifá, incorporating its rituals into political protest events. She told an interviewer in 2015 that "seeking spirituality had a lot to do with trying to seek understanding about my conditions—how these conditions shape me in my everyday life and how I understand them as part of a larger fight, a fight for my life."

== Career ==
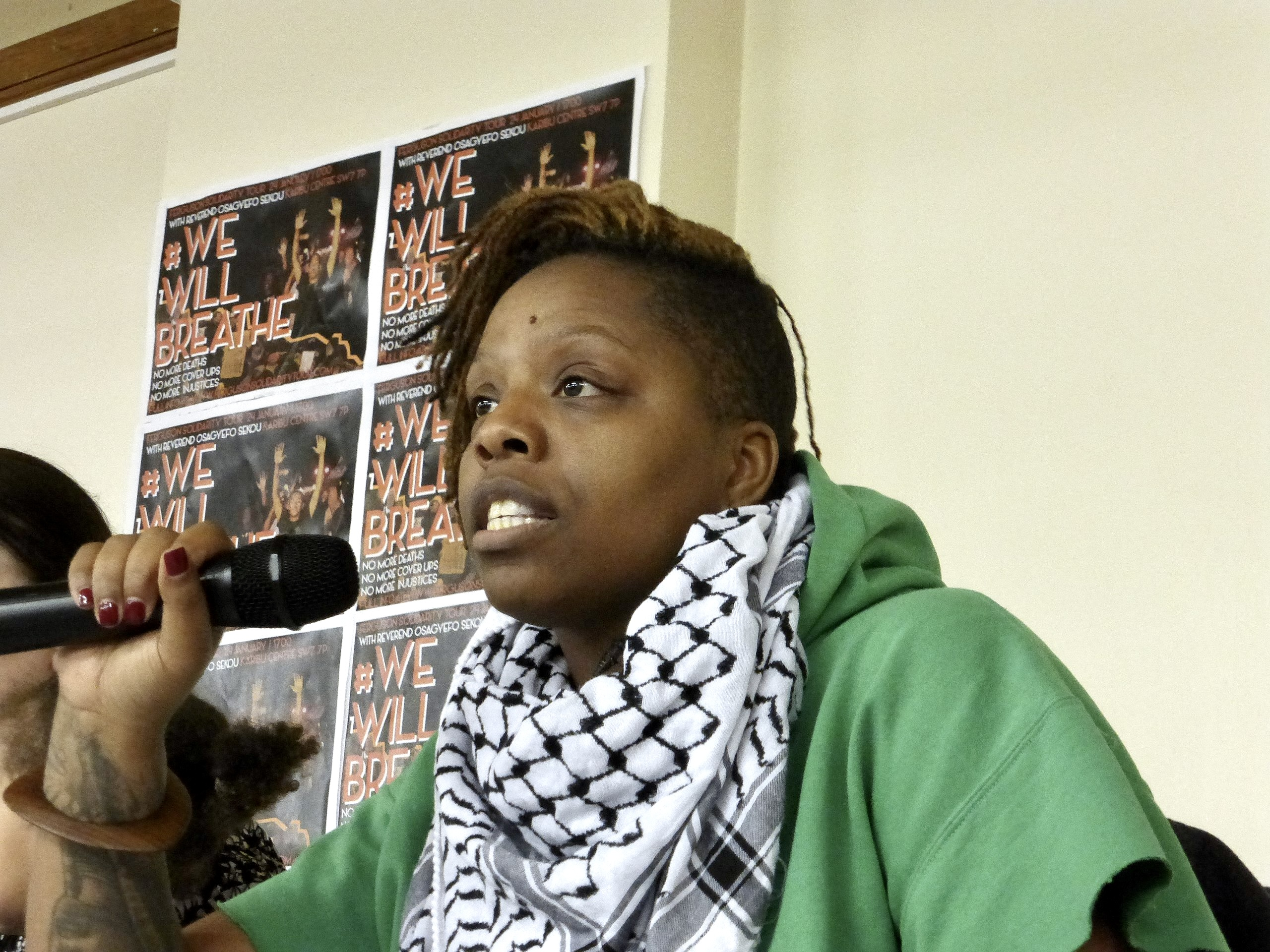
Cullors speaking in 2015

Cullors has taught at Otis College of Art and Design in the Public Practice Program. She has also taught in the Master's Arts in Social Justice and Community Organizing at Prescott College.

=== Black Lives Matter ===
Along with community organizers and friends Alicia Garza and Opal Tometi, Cullors founded Black Lives Matter. The three started the movement out of frustration over George Zimmerman's acquittal in the killing of Trayvon Martin. Cullors created the hashtag #BlackLivesMatter in 2013 to corroborate Garza's use of the phrase in making a Facebook post about the Martin case. Cullors further described her impetus for pushing for African-American rights stemming from her 19-year-old brother's brutalization during imprisonment in Los Angeles County jails.

Cullors and her BLM co-founders, Garza and Tometi, set out to build a decentralized movement governed by consensus of a members' collective and in 2015, a network of chapters was formed. Cullors has been the most publicly visible of the co-founders, especially after Garza and Tometi stepped back from regular involvement in the organization. She credits social media being instrumental in revealing violence against African Americans, saying: "On a daily basis, every moment, black folks are being bombarded with images of our death ... It's literally saying, 'Black people, you might be next. You will be next, but in hindsight it will be better for our nation, the less of our kind, the more safe it will be."

In 2017, she said that the movement would not meet with United States president Donald Trump just as it would not have met with Adolf Hitler, as Trump "is literally the epitome of evil, all the evils of this country, be it racism, capitalism, sexism, homophobia."

In May 2021 (after holding the position for six years which included setting up the organization's infrastructure) Cullors resigned from her formal role as executive director of the Black Lives Matter Global Network Foundation, to focus on her second book and a multi-year TV deal with Warner Bros. She said that her resignation had nothing to do with alleged attempts to discredit her and that it had been planned for over a year. Cullors said "I think I will probably be less visible, because I won't be at the helm of one of the largest, most controversial organizations right now in the history of our movement...But no movement is one leader."

=== Other activism ===
She has served as executive director of the Coalition to End Sheriff Violence in L.A. Jails. The group advocated for a civilian commission to oversee the Los Angeles County Sheriff's Department in order to curb abuses by officers. By organizing former jail inmates as a voting bloc, the group hoped to sway the L.A. County Board of Supervisors to create such a commission, as well as gather enough votes to elect a replacement for L.A. County Sheriff Lee Baca, who resigned in 2014 for separate reasons. However, the group did not succeed in its efforts.

Cullors co-founded the prison activist organization Dignity and Power Now, which succeeded in advocating for a civilian oversight board.

She is also a board member of the Ella Baker Center for Human Rights, having led a think tank on state and vigilante violence for the 2014 Without Borders Conference. In October 2020, she launched a production company with a deal with Warner Bros. Television.

=== Ideology and policy positions ===
Cullors defines herself as a prison, police and "militarization" abolitionist, a position she says is inspired by "a legacy of black-led anti-colonial struggle in the United States and throughout the Americas." She also favors reparations for what she describes as "the historical pains and damage caused by European settler colonialism," in various forms, such as "financial restitution, land redistribution, political self-determination, culturally relevant education programs, language recuperation, and the right to return (or repatriation)."

She cites the activist and formerly incarcerated Weather Underground member Eric Mann, as her mentor during her early activist years at the Bus Riders Union of Los Angeles. She draws on various ideological inspirations. One is black feminists such as Audre Lorde and her "Black, queer, feminist lens", as well as bell hooks : both "helped [her] understand [her] identity". She cites Angela Davis for her "political theories and reflections on anticapitalist movements around the world", her work towards "a broader antiracist and antiwar movement", and her fight against white supremacy in the United States. Frantz Fanon is another inspiration, his "work on colonial violence in Algeria and across the Third World [making] timely connections" for the understanding of the context in which Black people live across the world. She also cites Karl Marx, Vladimir Lenin and Mao Zedong, as "provid[ing] a new understanding around what our economies could look like". In a 2015 interview that resurfaced in 2020, Cullors stated that she and co-founder Garza were "trained Marxists".

Asked whether she believed in violence as a method of protest, she has said that she believes in "direct action, but nonviolent direct action," and that this was also the belief of the Black Lives Matter movement.

In February 2020, Cullors co-endorsed Senators Elizabeth Warren and Bernie Sanders in the 2020 Democratic Party presidential primaries.

== Works ==
In 2014 Cullors produced the theatrical piece POWER: From the Mouths of the Occupied, which debuted at Highways Performance Space. She has contributed articles about the movement to the LA Progressive, including an article from December 2015 titled "The Future of Black Life" which pushed the idea that activists could no longer wait for the State to take action, and called her followers into action by encouraging them to begin building the world that they want to see.

=== Books ===
Cullors' memoir, When They Call You a Terrorist: A Black Lives Matter Memoir was published in January 2018. It was co-written with the journalist asha bandele and featured a foreword from Angela Davis. The book has two parts, All the Bones We Could Find, which narrates her adolescence, and Black Lives Matter, which explains how those experiences led up to her to co-establishing the social justice group. The book deals with the imprisonment and disenfranchisement of black men like her father, incarceration "is how our society responded to his drug use...I think we have a crisis of divesting from poor communities, black communities in particular, and reinvesting into these communities with police, jails, courts, prisons". In the 13th chapter A Call, A Response, Cullors outlines the first series of marches she, Garza and Tometi organized in the wake of Zimmerman's acquittal. The chapter concludes: "We are a generation called to action." The Times Literary Supplement regarded the book as a "magnificent accomplishment." It appeared at number 12 on the nonfiction hardcover The New York Times Best Seller list on February 4, 2018.

Her second book was released by St Martin's Press on 25 January 2022, titled An Abolitionist's Handbook: 12 Steps to Change Yourself and the World. Cullors describes it as a guide for activists on how to take care of each other and resolve internal conflicts while campaigning.

=== Television and film ===
Cullors appeared in the 2016 documentary Stay Woke: The Black Lives Matter Movement.

She subsequently produced the YouTube Originals series Resist, which premiered November 18, 2020. The 12-part series followed Cullors and other activists in episodes 6-11-minutes in length. The series aired free on Cullors' YouTube channel, and she described it as well-received, telling IndieWire that "Folks were moved, and also I think surprised at how not boring the series is."

In October 2020, Cullors signed a multi-year deal with Warner Brothers to develop original programming focused on amplifying Black Lives Matter and Black perspectives, but the contract was later canceled in 2022 after she reportedly produced no content.

== Personal life ==
Cullors identifies as queer. In 2016, she married Janaya Khan, a social activist who co-founded Black Lives Matter Toronto.

== Controversies ==
In 2021, a controversy arose in some media outlets, following reports that Cullors (or entities associated with her) had purchased several homes during a five-year period. Critics accused her of using the Black Lives Matter movement to enrich herself and accused her of being a hypocrite for purchasing the houses as someone who identifies as a "Marxist." Cullors denied any wrongdoing and defended her actions as an effort to take care of her family and described the criticism as an "effort to discredit and harass me and my family" by the political right. On April 13, the Black Lives Matter Global Network Foundation denied that it had paid for her purchases of real estate and said they had not paid her since 2019, adding that she had only received $120,000 since 2013 for carrying out her work related to the organization.

Her other brother Paul, a graffiti artist and founder of Cullors Protection LLC, received $840,000 from BLMGNF for security and consulting. Cullors defended hiring her brother, saying registered security firms which hired former police officers could not be trusted.

Some BLM activists accused her of "monopolizing and capitalizing our fight." Ten local chapters of the Foundation claimed that Cullors became its executive director “against the will of most chapters and without their knowledge,” that chapter organizers were prevented from influencing the group's direction, and that the national organization provided little to no financial support for local chapters since its inception in 2013. Cullors resigned from leadership of the Foundation in May 2021, and later revealed psychological exhaustion from the controversy, stating that she was receiving treatment for post-traumatic stress disorder.

In 2022, Cullors denied allegations of misusing donations given to the Black Lives Matter Global Network Foundation, but admitted to hosting two parties at a mansion the BLM Foundation purchased for $6 million.

== Awards ==
- 2007 Mario Savio Young Activist of the Year
- An NAACP History Maker, 2015
- With Opal Tometi, and Alicia Garza (as "The Women of #BlackLivesMatter") listed as one of the nine runners-up for The Advocate's Person of the Year, 2015
- A Glamour Woman of the Year, 2016
- One of Fortune's World's Greatest Leaders, 2016
- An honorary doctorate from Clarkson University
- the 2018 recipient of the José Muñoz Award from CLAGS: The Center for LGBTQ Studies at the CUNY Graduate Center
- In 2015, the Los Angeles Times named her one of "the new civil rights leaders."
- In June 2020, in honor of the 50th anniversary of the first LGBTQ Pride parade, Queerty named her among the 50 heroes "leading the nation toward equality, acceptance, and dignity for all people."
- In 2020, she was included on Time's list of the 100 most influential people in the world.
- Cullors was on the list of the BBC's 100 Women announced in November 2020.
- Along with Opal Tometi and Alicia Garza, Cullors was retroactively named one of the 2013 Women of the Year by Time in 2020 as part of its "100 Women of the Year" project.
