= Janaya =

Janaya is a given name. Janaya means “God’s gracious gift” or “Gift of/from god.” Notable people with the name include:

- Janaya Khan, Canadian social activist
- Janaya Stephens, Canadian actress
