= Highways Performance Space =

Venue in Santa Monica, California

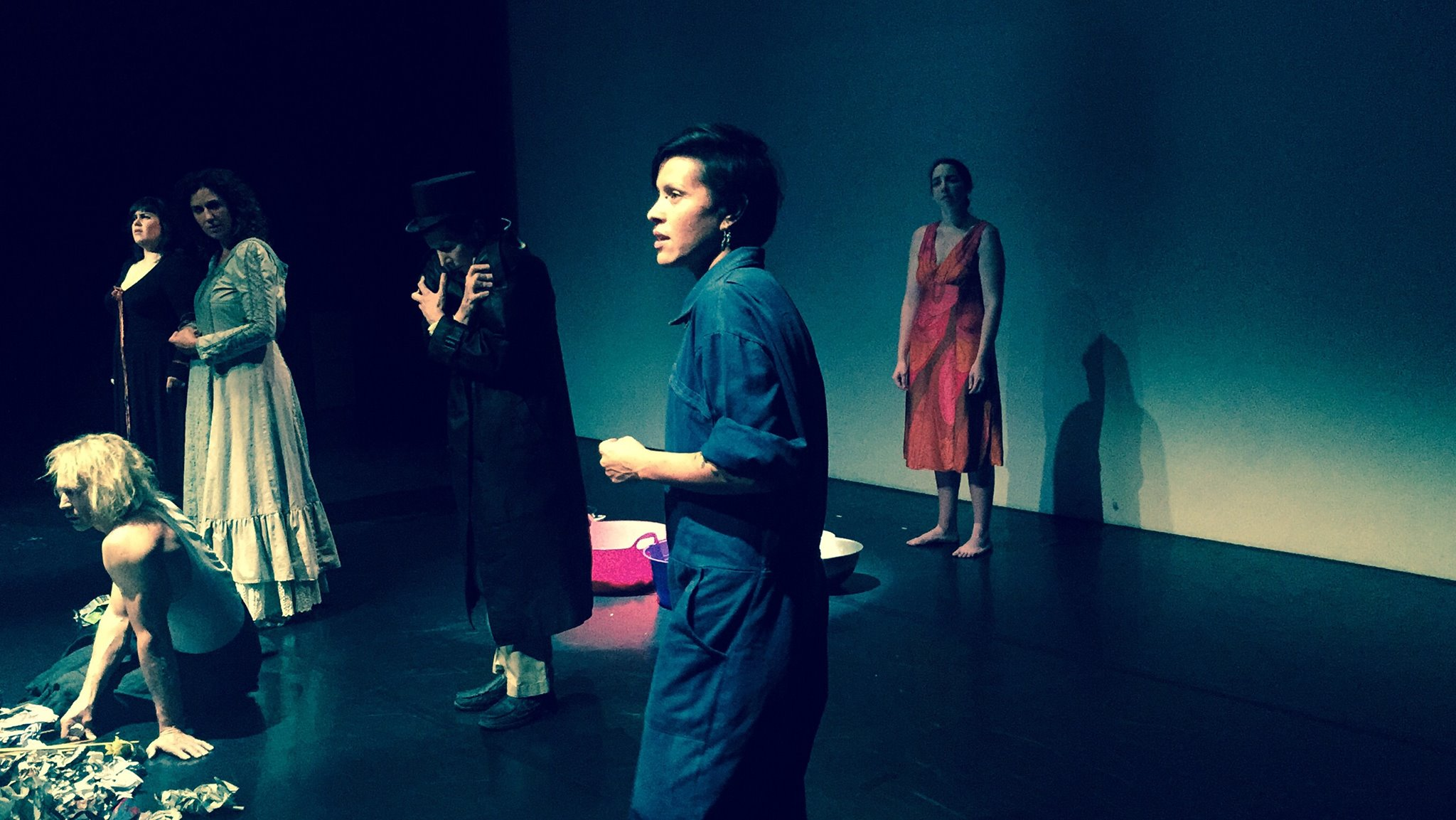
Performance of "How to Make a Monster", at the Highways Performance Space, 2015

The Highways Performance Space is a performance venue in Santa Monica, California, which focuses on new works and alternative pieces. The organization is a space for LGBTQ artists to experiment with form and content. Performed work includes theatre, music, dance, spoken word, interactive media, and visual arts.

== History ==
The venue was founded in May 1989 by writer Linda Frye Burnham and performance artist Tim Miller. They were co-directors until 1992, when Burnham stepped down, leaving Miller as Artistic Director throughout the 1990s. Danielle Brazell served the position until December 2003. Leo Garcia, who had been involved with Highways since 1992, was named the executive director in 2003.In 2024, Garcia and Artistic Director Patrick Kennelly celebrated Highways' 35th anniversary.

The space prides itself on avoiding censoring its artists, and has thrived so far despite historical censorships and regulations on artists discussing the HIV/AIDS epidemic, one of the key issues facing the LGBTQ community in the organization’s earlier years.

== Galleries and Workshops ==
In addition to the main performance space, Highways also features two galleries and a workshop program, the Highways Performance Lab. Together, all the spaces present approximately 250 performances per year, and curate and exhibit about 12 contemporary visual art exhibits annually. They commission and premiere new work, organize special events, curate festivals, and offer residency and educational programs to engage community members in the arts.

Some of the earliest workshops were led my Tim Miller himself, centered on gay male performance, and these workshops eventually expanded to other venues in the United States and Britain. Workshops ranged from one-day affairs to more complex processes, culminating in performances by the workshop participants. Several of Miller’s performances drew from experiences at the workshops, including his famous pieces My Queer Body and Us.

== Past Artists ==
Highways has presented work from thousands of emerging artists and collectives. Below is a non-exhaustive list of some noteworthy artists that have had their work presented at Highways:

Luis Alfaro, Elia Arce, Ron Athey, Cornerstone Theater, Quentin Crisp, Patrisse Cullors, Diavolo Dance Theater, Karen Finley, John Fleck, Simone Forti, Rosanna Gamson Worldwide, Stephanie Gilliland, Guillermo Gomez-Pena, The Hittite Empire, Dan Kwong, Los Angeles Poverty Dept., Victoria Marks, Sir Ian McKellen, Oguri, Rudy Perez, Phranc, Denise Uyehara, and Kristina Wong.

== Current Festivals ==
=== Latina/o New Works Festival & Working Titles ===
Latina/o New Works series, featuring new performance, spoken word, dance, and inter-disciplinary works that speak to the evolution of established and emerging Latina/o artists on both a local and international level.

=== Highways’ Annual Poetry Festival ===
Features embraced local and national poets, slam champions, youth poets, editors, actors, authors, teachers and cultural workers from the queer, black, Asian, literary, Latina/o and hip-hop communities

=== Highways’ BEHOLD! A Queer Performance Festival ===
Inspired by Highways’ previous Ecce Lesbo-Ecce Homo Festival, it has expanded to a summer-long series of new LGBTQ performance, dance, spoken word, theater, multi-media, and ritual.

=== Queer Mondays ===
An un-curated LGBTQ experimental performance series that takes place on the last Monday of every month.

== Funding ==
Recently, Highways has received funding from the California Arts Council, California Community Foundation, The James Irvine Foundation, the National Endowment for the Arts (NEA), the City of Santa Monica Cultural Affairs Division, The L.A. County Department of Cultural Affairs, The Getty Grant Program and the City of West Hollywood, among others.

However, due to the controversial nature of many of their projects, they have faced difficulties regarding funding in the past, including a 1995 incident regarding their Ecce Lesbo/Ecco Homo festival, which caused the NEA to revoke all their funding towards the institution and left them dependent on fund-raisers and ticket sales.

== Awards and Accolades ==
Some of the institutions that have awarded the Highways Performance Space for its innovations as a community-based presenter include:

- The Alliance of Los Angeles Playwrights,
- GLAAD (Gay and Lesbian Alliance Against Defamation) (Community Service Award, 1994)
- The Los Angeles Drama Critics Association.

== See also ==
- Tim Miller
- Linda Frye Burnham
- Performance Art
- Performance Space 122
