= Sandy Hudson =

Jamaican-Canadian political activist

- Born: Sandra Hudson; Toronto, Ontario, Canada
- Education: University of Toronto, University of California, Los Angeles
- Organization(s): Black Lives Matter, Black Legal Action Centre
- Known for: Black Lives Matter, Sandy and Nora Talk Politics

Sandy Hudson is a Jamaican-Canadian political activist, writer from Toronto, Ontario, Canada. She is the co-founder of the Black Lives Matter movement presence in Canada.

== Early life and education ==
Sandy Hudson grew up in North York and attended high school in Brampton. She attended the University of Toronto, where she earned a bachelor's degree in political science and sociology. She also holds a Master of Arts in Social Justice Education from the University of Toronto. She currently resides in Los Angeles, where she is attending UCLA School of Law.

== Student Union lawsuit ==
In the year of 2015, the University of Toronto Students' Union filed a lawsuit against Hudson and the outgoing President and Vice-President. The lawsuit demanded Hudson return $277,508.62 in severance pay and overtime, paid on dismissal from her position as student union executive director and approved by the outgoing President and Vice President, alleging that the dismissal prior to the end of her period of tenure was without legal basis and that she was not eligible for overtime payments. The lawsuit had alleged that the outgoing executives Bollo-Kamara and Wathey “breached their fiduciary duty” by signing off on 2,589.5 hours of overtime for Hudson, which was included in the severance package upon the termination of her contract. 1,974.5 hours of those 2,589.5 overtime hours were logged in a single entry on April 1, 2015. The severance pay and overtime was paid in the weeks after her slate's loss in the student elections and equated 10% of the union's budget. The lawsuit sought a further $200,000 in punitive damages from the three for breach of fiduciary trust. Hudson countersued the student union for $300,000 for breach of a confidentiality clause in her severance agreement and alleging "inappropriate conduct and unwelcome comments from UTSU directors [...] in relation to [her] perceived sexual orientation, gender and race". The lawsuit was settled out-of-court with all parties in 2016 and 2017 and Hudson agreed to repay some of the overtime payment.

== Activism ==
Hudson started the Toronto chapter of Black Lives Matter after being encouraged by her brother to do something following the police killings of Mike Brown and Jermaine Carby. Thousands attended a solidarity rally that she organized with Janaya Khan. After the rally, they contacted Patrisse Cullors to establish the group as the first official chapter of Black Lives Matter outside of the United States. The group has challenged different forms of anti-Black racism in Canada, and has made issues like carding and defunding the police national conversations.

In 2017, she started the Black Legal Action Centre with Zanana Akande and Rinaldo Walcott. The centre is a legal clinic that provides legal aid services to Black Ontarians and engages in test case litigation.

== Works ==
=== Writing ===
Hudson is a freelance writer and author. She has published academic writings in Race and Racialization: Essential Readings, Second Edition and New Framings on Anti-Racism and Resistance, Volume 2: Resistance and the New Futurity. She has written for NOW Magazine, The Washington Post, Huffington Post, FLARE Magazine and Maclean's Magazine. Her first book, Until We Are Free: Reflections on Black Lives Matter in Canada, was released in 2020.

=== Lectures ===
Hudson is a speaker with the National Speakers Bureau of Canada. She has spoken at universities, labour unions, and institutions across Canada, including the University of Toronto, the Canadian Labour Congress, and the Canadian Institute for the Administration of Justice.

=== Podcast ===
In 2017, she started the Sandy and Nora Talk Politics podcast with her friend and co-host Nora Loreto. The podcast analyzes Canadian news and encourages listeners to become activists in their communities.

== Awards and recognition ==
In 2016, Hudson was named one of Toronto Life's most influential Torontonians, and in 2017 was named one of Toronto's most inspiring women by Post City Magazine. She was awarded the Lincoln Alexander Award by Osgoode Hall Law School in 2018 and the Emerging Leader award by the Ontario Institute for Studies in Education in 2019. She regularly provides comment in Canadian mainstream media on issues of race. She was featured in Charles Officer's CBC Television documentary The Skin We're In, and in the 2016 and 2020 CBC News' features Being Black in Canada. Her activism has been featured in The New York Times, Newsweek, and Complex.
