= Bus Riders Union (Los Angeles) =

Transit advocacy organization in Los Angeles, California

- Abbreviation: BRU
- Formation: 1992
- Type: Grassroots Civil Rights Organization
- Headquarters: Los Angeles, California
- Region served: Los Angeles, California
- Members: 3,000
- Chairperson: Barbara Lott-Holland
- Chairperson: Eric Mann
- Website: thestrategycenter.org/project/bus-riders-union

The Bus Riders Union (BRU) (also called Sindicato de Pasajeros (SDP) and 버스 승객 조합 (버승조)) is a United States civil rights social movement organization established in Los Angeles, California, in 1994.

The BRU's central focus has been policies of the Los Angeles County Metropolitan Transportation Authority (LACMTA) that it identifies as racial discrimination. The BRU attracted international attention when it successfully sued LACMTA under Title VI of the Civil Rights Act in 1994.

== Formation ==
The Bus Rider's Union is a project of the Labor/Community Strategy Center (LCSC) that began as an outgrowth of the LCSC's Labor/Community Watchdog environmental justice campaign against air pollution in the L.A. Port area. The BRU was founded by the LSCS's director, Eric Mann, who is also co-chair of the union along with Barbara Lott-Holland. The LCSC began organizing bus riders in 1992, and, as it expanded its tactics from grassroots organizing to include legal action, it built "across geographic and ethnic lines" to bring together "a multiethnic, progressive coalition." In 1996, it filed a civil rights lawsuit in association with the Southern Christian Leadership Conference and Korean Immigrant Workers Advocates against the Los Angeles County Metropolitan Transportation Authority, alleging that the LACMTA was using federal funds for public transit in a discriminatory manner.

A feature-length documentary titled Bus Riders Union (2000) directed by Academy Award-winning cinematographer Haskell Wexler, captures the early years of organizing through to the signing of the consent decree.

== LACMTA lawsuit ==
Represented by Constance Rice and others from the NAACP Legal Defense and Educational Fund, LCSC, BRU, Southern Christian Leadership Conference and Korean Immigrant Workers Advocates were able first to obtain an injunction preventing LACMTA from eliminating the monthly pass in 1994. In 1996 after a high-profile media and grassroots campaign against LACMTA's policies of "transit racism," LCSC, BRU et al. agreed to sign with LACMTA a Title VI consent decree.

The plaintiffs argued that LACMTA was using disproportionately more of its federal funds on the suburban-oriented rail service and its wealthier, whiter ridership, at the same time as it was spending disproportionately less on the bus system and its much larger, lower-income ridership, predominantly made up of people of color. As of July 2007, 17% of LACMTA's rail riders were white classified as white non-Hispanics. In contrast, only 10% of bus riders were classified as white non-Hispanics. Martin Wachs and Richard Berk of UCLA, and James Moore II of USC were among the professors of transportation, planning and statistics who provided expert reports and other assistance to the plaintiffs. The former chief financial officer of LACMTA's predecessor agency, Thomas Rubin, also provided key assistance to the plaintiffs. LACMTA agreed to settle the case on the eve of the trial, "when it faced extensive public disclosure and media coverage of its discriminatory, inefficient, and environmentally destructive transportation policies."

The consent decree required LACMTA to:

- retain the unlimited monthly-use pass and reduce it from $49 to $42; reduce the biweekly pass from $26.50 to $21; and to create a new weekly pass for $11
- purchase 102 buses to ease existing overcrowding on the buses
- commit to reducing overcrowding levels by specified goals and specified times, working under a court-appointed Special Master with BRU in a Joint Working Group over the life of the decree
- create new bus services designed to connect people of color and the poor to job and medical sites.

The LACMTA and BRU disagreed many times whether the LACTMA was in compliance with the new rules. Over the course of the decree, it appealed rulings based on the consent decree numerous times, including a final appeal that it took to the Supreme Court, which was rejected in March 2002. In 2006, as the decree was set to expire, BRU et al. filed an appeal to extend it, but it was rejected by the Ninth Circuit Court of Appeals in 2009.

=== Controversy ===
The consent decree has been a controversial subject in local news media. Over the course of the decree, local columnists and news outlet OpEds have taken positions for and against the decree and various rulings associated with it.

== Current activism ==
The BRU was one of the sponsors of the Great American Boycott demonstration in Los Angeles on May 1, 2006. The current campaign is "1,000 More Buses, 1,000 Less Police", as the BRU is advocating that policing be reduced throughout the city because of past abuses by the Los Angeles Police Department of minority civil rights.

The LCSC has launched a Center for Transportation Strategies intended to expand its involvement with regional and national transportation issues as an outgrowth of a 2005 conference attended by activists from around the U.S.

Since 2004, the BRU has engaged in an ongoing advocacy campaign for the placing of bus only lanes along Wilshire Boulevard.

== Criticism ==
Criticism of the BRU points to the high use of some LACMTA rail lines among minorities to argue that the BRU legal case and its assertion of racism has no basis. Critics also take issue with the BRU’s rhetorical or political style, contending that BRU organizers are overly combative and ideological. An additional line of criticism draws from modal debates in the field of urban transit planning, asserting that rail should hold a higher priority than the bus, or that the BRU’s overemphasis on one mode is counterproductive.

In addition, criticism has centered on the BRU's non-bus related civil rights activities. A columnist in the Jewish Journal criticized the BRU for publishing flyers comparing the situation of Palestinians to that of Jews in Nazi Germany, and questioned the BRU taking funds from the Nathan Cummings Foundation, a foundation "formed in the Jewish tradition".

== See also ==
- Bus Riders Union (Vancouver)
