= Linda Frye Burnham =

American writer, editor

- Born: 1940 (age 85–86); Bartlesville, Oklahoma
- Occupations: founding editor High Performance Magazine; The Drama Review; writer Artforum magazine; co-founding editor of Community Arts Network; arts organizer and co-founder of 18th Street Arts Center, Highways Performance Space, Art in the Public Interest
- Spouse: Steven Durland
- Children: Jill Burnham, Anthony Burnham, Andrew Burnham
- Parent(s): Eldon and Margaret Frye

Linda Frye Burnham (born 1940) is an American writer whose work and research focuses on performance art, community art, education and activism. In 1978 she was the founding editor of High Performance Magazine and later served as co-editor with Steven Durland until 1997. She has served as a staff writer for Artforum magazine, contributor to The Drama Review, among other publications. As an arts organizer Burnham co-founded in Santa Monica, California, the 18th Street Arts Center (1988 with Susanna Dakin), and Highways Performance Space (1989 with Tim Miller). In 1995 she cofounded Art in the Public Interest with Steven Durland in North Carolina, as well as cofounding the Community Arts Network in 1999 with Steven Durland, Robert Leonard and Ann Kilkelly. Burnham received a Bachelor of Arts in Humanities from the University of Southern California, and a Masters of Fine Arts in creative writing from the University of California, Irvine.

== Published works ==
Burnham’s writing has been published in numerous journals and art magazines in both the United States and the UK. She wrote BOB & BOB: The First Five Years, 1980, Astro Artz Books, She wrote (with Durland) The Citizen Artist: 20 Years of Art in the Public Arena, Critical Press, Incorporated (1st edition 1998). Among the books she has edited are: Making Exact Change: How U.S. arts-based programs have made a significant and sustained impact on their communities, (2005); Performing Communities Grassroots Ensemble Theaters, New Village Press (2006); Bridge Conversations: People Who Live and Work in Multiple Worlds, Arts & Democracy Press (2011).

== Awards and distinctions ==
In 1999 Burnham was awarded a lifetime achievement award from the Women’s Caucus for Art. In 2013, she and Steven Durland received the ATHE Award for Leadership in Community-based Theater and Civic Engagement.
