= Martin Wachs =

American professor (1941–2021)

- Born: June 8, 1941
- Died: April 12, 2021 (aged 79); Los Angeles, California
- Education: City College, City University of New York; Northwestern University
- Years active: 50
- Employer(s): UCLA Urban Planning and Institute of Transportation Studies; UC Berkeley, Institute of Transportation Studies; Northwestern University; University of Illinois at Chicago
- Known for: Transportation planning, urban planning, equity in planning
- Board member of: President, Transportation Research Board, 2000; California High Speed Rail Peer Review Group; Director, Transportation, Space and Technology Program at Rand Corp.
- Spouse: Helen
- Children: Faye Linda, Steven Brett
- Awards: Pyke Johnson Award for outstanding paper published in the field of transportation systems planning and administration, Transportation Research Board, 2019, 1976

Martin Wachs (1941–2021) was an American professor emeritus of Urban Planning at the University of California, Los Angeles and of City and Regional Planning and of Civil and Environmental Engineering at the University of California, Berkeley. He began his career in university teaching in 1968 and retired from teaching in 2006, to work at the Rand Corporation until 2010.

== Early years ==
Martin Wachs was born June 8, 1941. He attended City College, City University of New York, receiving his bachelor's degree in 1963. He received his master's degree (1965) and his PhD in civil engineering from Northwestern University in 1967.

== Career ==
He taught at University of Illinois at Chicago as assistant professor of systems engineering, then as assistant professor of civil engineering at Northwestern University before heading west to California. He was an associate professor in a newly founded Graduate School of Architecture and Urban Planning at University of California, Los Angeles in 1971, the start of a long career in the University of California system. Besides teaching in Los Angeles, he spent 10 years at UC Berkeley, with the Institute of Transportation Studies.

He was one of the earliest scholars to address transportation's relationship to social equity, environmental quality, and community values.

He wrote 180 articles and four books on subjects related to transportation and land use. Wachs was awarded the Guggenheim Fellowship for his exceptional scholarship in Architecture, Planning and Design and the Carey Award for service to the Transportation Research Board.

He retired from teaching in 2006, to work at the Rand Corporation until 2010.

In recognition of his extraordinary service, Wachs was honored by the American Institute of Certified Planners and the National Academy of Sciences.

== Death ==
Martin Wachs died at his home in Los Angeles on April 12, 2021, in the midst of collaborating on papers with colleagues.

== Books ==
- Transportation for the Elderly: Changing Lifestyles-Changing Needs. Berkeley: University of California Press, 1979.
- Ethics in Planning. New Brunswick: Center for Urban Policy Research, Rutgers University, 1985.
- The Car and the City: The Automobile, the Built Environment, and Daily Urban Life, University of Michigan Press, 1992.
- Transportation Planning on Trial: The Clean Air Act and Travel Forecasting. Sage Publications, 1996.
