= Janaya Khan =

Canadian non-binary social activist

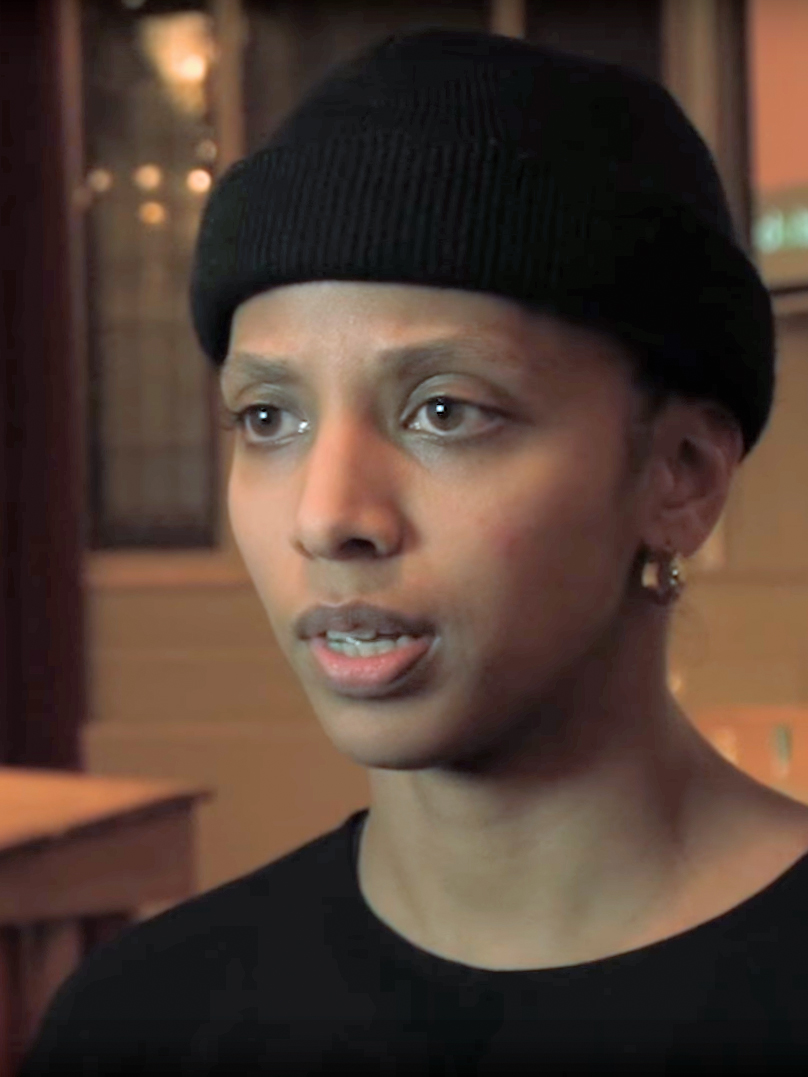
- Khan in 2018
- Born: Toronto, Ontario, Canada
- Other name: Future
- Education: York University
- Occupations: Activist, model, organizer, public speaker
- Known for: Black Lives Matter in Canada

Janaya Khan is a social activist from Toronto, Ontario, Canada. Khan is a co-founder of Black Lives Matter Toronto as well as an international ambassador for the Black Lives Matter Network. Kahn is non-binary. Much of their work analyzes intersectional topics including the Black Lives Matter movement, queer theory, Black feminism, and organized protest strategies.

== Personal life and education ==
Khan was born and raised in Toronto, Ontario, to a Trinidadian father and a British Jamaican mother who emigrated to Canada. Khan received a Bachelor of Arts from York University, graduating with an honours degree in English language and literature. Khan resides in Los Angeles as of 2020.

== Activism ==
Khan believes that the police do not keep people safe. Khan stated they would rather have "rapid response justice teams" in the place of police.

In a 2016 interview with Maclean's magazine, Khan discussed the challenges of growing up with an intersectional identity in a society lacking resources and understanding of intersectionality and transfeminism, highlighting experiences like police carding as pivotal moments that led them to activism and the founding of Black Lives Matter Toronto.

In October 2014, Khan and Hudson organized an action of solidarity following the death of 33-year-old Jermaine Carby, who was shot and killed during a routine traffic stop in Brampton, Ontario, on September 24, 2014. This incident occurred a month after the August 9 shooting of Michael Brown in the United States. After announcing the protest, around 4,000 people gathered to demonstrate in solidarity outside the US Consulate. Wanting to build on this momentum, they decided to meet with Los Angeles-based Patrisse Cullors, one of the founders of the Black Lives Matter movement in the United States. This meeting launched the foundations for Black Lives Matter to become an international movement rather than one based only in the United States. Khan founded the Toronto chapter alongside Sandy Hudson and controversial activist Yusra Khogali in November 2014, the first chapter to be established in Canada.

Khan has led a number of demonstrations and events in Toronto, mainly based on instances of police brutality in the United States and Canada. In July 2016, they helped organize a sit-in during Pride Toronto, where protesters came prepared with a list of demands including more representation of minority groups and no uniformed police presence during Pride.

== Lectures ==
Khan has presented across Canada at a number of institutions, including the University of Toronto and York University. They have also given talks at many campuses in the United States, including Bryn Mawr College and Emerson College. In 2016, they were joined by Black Lives Matter co-founder Opal Tometi to speak at Smith College's "When and Where I Enter" symposium.

== Recognition and awards ==
Khan is the recipient of multiple awards, including the 2015 Bromley Armstrong Human Rights Award from the Toronto & York Region Labour Council, and was named one of "Toronto's Most Influential" by Toronto Life in 2016. They have written for The Root, Al Jazeera, and the Huffington Post.
