= Bus Riders Union (Vancouver) =

Non-profit organization in Metro Vancouver, Canada

The Bus Riders Union (BRU) in Vancouver, British Columbia, was a non-profit organization that advocates for better public transit services in Greater Vancouver. It criticized TransLink for such things as raising bus fares and the approval of the construction of the Canada Line rapid transit project, claiming that it would be built at the expense of adequately maintaining the bus system. The BRU was modelled after the Los Angeles–based Bus Riders Union. Like its Los Angeles counterpart, the Vancouver BRU argued that transit issues disproportionately affect people of colour, women, and poor people. The BRU engaged in various protest, advocacy, and educational activities, and had approximately 950 members.

The campaigns waged by the BRU included a fare strike to protest against rising fares and a campaign to restore the "night owl" late night bus service. The "night owl" bus campaign, launched in 2001, succeeded after TransLink voted to reinstate the service in April 2004. The BRU also campaigned for more wheelchair-accessible and clean air buses.

On October 22, 2005, the Canadian Race Relations Foundation (CRRF), at their Fourth Biannual Award of Excellence in Toronto, awarded its top prize to the Vancouver Bus Riders Union. The CRRF identified the "night owl" bus campaign victory as one of the factors which influenced the Awards Jury, chaired by Mary-Woo Sims.
