= High Performance Magazine =

Performance art quarterly magazine

High Performance Magazine, Vol 1, No. 4

High Performance was a quarterly arts magazine based out of Los Angeles founded in 1978 and published until 1997. Its editorial mission was to provide support and a critical context for new, innovative and unrecognized work in the arts.

High Performance started out covering exclusively performance art and gradually grew to include video, sound, and public art. It dealt with viewing the arts in the larger context of contemporary life, examining how the arts contribute in addressing social and cultural concerns, and also how those concerns impact the arts. In 1994, High Performance received the Alternative Press Award for Cultural Coverage from the Utne Reader, and was nominated three other times for the same award.

== Editors and publishers ==
Linda Frye Burnham served as the magazine's founding editor from 1978 to 1985. Steven Durland was the editor from 1986 until its end in 1997. From 1983 to 1995, High Performance was published by Astro Artz (renamed 18th Street Arts Center in 1988). In July 1995, High Performance was acquired by Art in the Public Interest (API), a new organization formed by Burnham and Durland to research and develop information about artists collaborating with their communities. After a brief hiatus, the magazine renewed publication in early 1996 and published five more issues, but rising costs and an inability to garner needed stabilization funding forced API to cease publication in 1997. In 1999, Burnham and Durland initiated the Community Arts Network on the Web. Much of the content from High Performance is available on that site

== Also see ==
- Bob & Bob
- Chris Burden
- Paul McCarthy
- Johanna Went
