= 18th Street Arts Center =

Arts center in Santa Monica, California, U.S.

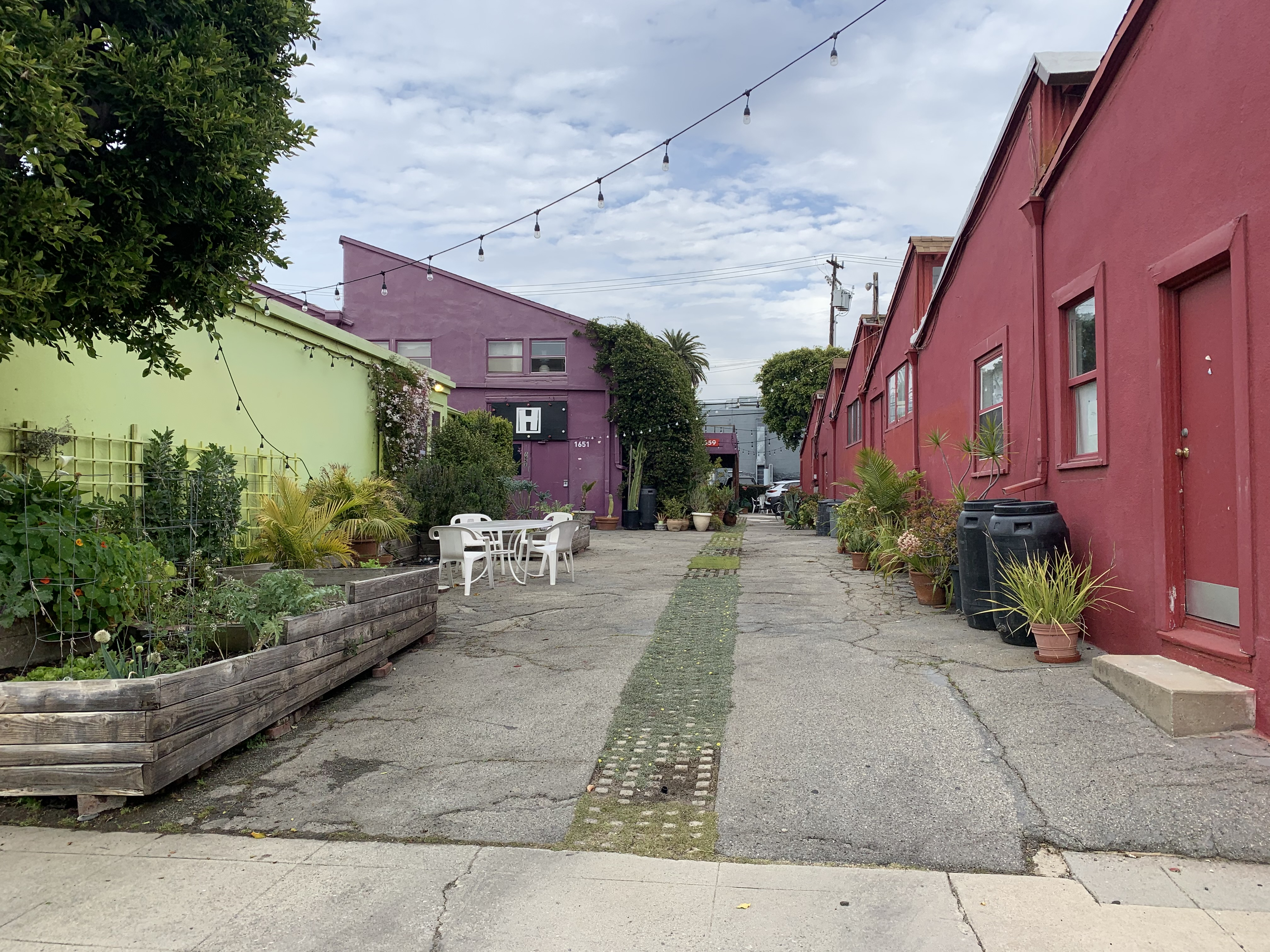
- The courtyard between buildings at the 18th Street Arts Center
- Interactive map of 18th Street Arts Center
- Address: 1639 18th Street
- Location: Santa Monica, California
- Coordinates: 34.024157°N 118.477424°W

Construction
- Opened: 1988

Website
- https://18thstreet.org/

18th Street Arts Center is an artist residency programs in the United States based in Southern California. Conceived as a radical think tank in the shape of an artist community, 18th Street supports artists from around the globe to develop meaningful artworks through research, innovative thinking, and community engagement. Part of the organization’s goal is to provide artists the space and time to take risks and exhibit their works publicly, fostering the ideal environment for artists and the community to directly engage, and to create experiences and partnerships that foster positive social change.

Before the official founding of 18th Street Arts Center, the campus served as a studio for a group of feminist artists throughout the 1970s-1980s, providing space for artists in new genres. Artists like Judy Chicago, Susanna Bixby Dakin, Barbara T. Smith, and Linda Burman laid the foundation for the space’s long history of supporting new genres and feminist movements. Since the Center was founded as a nonprofit under its official name in 1988, 18th Street has fostered and supported the work of many Los Angeles artists and has welcomed artists across the world to visit the LA County art scene. 18th Street also hosted the West Coast arm of ACT-UP, a grassroots organization aimed at addressing the AIDS crisis. Additionally, it was the site of publication for High Performance, a quarterly, Los Angeles-based magazine that published reviews of performance and experimental artworks for nearly two decades. It continues to cultivate socially responsible art from local and international artists, serving the community by ensuring art is accessible to a wider network of audiences.

== Residency ==
As one of the top 20 residencies in the US, 18th Street Arts Center has hosted more than 600 artists from around the world since its opening in 1992. The program oversees 20 annual visiting artists, as well as a number of long-term artists, some of whom have been at the residency for multiple decades. Geared at “provoking public dialogue through contemporary art making,” the residency program at 18th Street values art-making as an essential component of a healthy and just society. The program aims to foster community growth and interconnectedness, helping not only to expand an artist’s individual practice and career, but also to promote meaningful cultural exchange throughout Los Angeles. During the residency’s history, more than 6,000 artists have participated in community programming at 18th Street, either through group and solo exhibitions, special events, and bimonthly artist presentations called “Intersections”. For a short period of time beginning in 2010, 18th Street managed the residency program at the Santa Monica airport as well, but concluded this in 2024.

The program is open to visual and performing artists, curators, writers, musicians, and arts organizations. The Center offers four different types of residences: local artists in residence, visiting artists, curator in residence, and local organizations in residence. These residencies provide artists and creative organizations the space to create and commune with other artists. Residencies are typically accompanied by relevant programming organized by the residents and 18th Street faculty, which are community-based events open to the public.

== Exhibitions ==
In addition to scheduled programming, 18th Street Arts Center supports artists in organizing exhibitions, connecting social practices with the public by displaying current contemporary works. 18th Street has multiple exhibition spaces on their campus, those of which include the Atrium Gallery and the Hearth, which typically rotate shows every five weeks. The Hearth commonly provides space for residents’ solo exhibitions, but occasionally hosts group shows from partner organizations whose missions 18th Street uplifts and supports.

In addition to regularly scheduled exhibition cycles, the Center also hosted a program called Artist Lab until 2010, a core exhibition initiative at the residency. Its objective was to provide artists with an opportunity to critically develop their practice, either individually or through collaboration with a team. The program focused on process, encouraging artists to use the gallery space, which was open to the public, as a studio while they generated thought-provoking programming, created installations, and modified their exhibition layout over the course of the three-month residency period. This harnessed the artist’s individual experiences at the residency and allowed them to engage with the public in a unique way. The program provided ever-evolving insight into processes integral to artists’ practice for public audiences, tapping into an undiscovered method of fostering accessibility in contemporary art-making.

During 18th Street’s time managing the Santa Monica airport residency, they also curated the Propeller Gallery, Slipstream Galleries, and the Glider Wall Gallery. Here, numerous artists from 18th Street’s residency program exhibited their works in conjunction with artists at the airport. These collaborations continued until the Center concluded its management of the airport residency, although the two organizations still remain in close connection with one another.

== Highlighted Programming ==
18th Street Arts Center is widely recognized for its public programs, those of which take the shape of workshops, artist talks, and community-wide cultural events. Each first and third Tuesday of the month, 18th Street hosts an artist “intersection,” where an artist in residence leads a free event open to the general public. These events are typically deeply intertwined with the ideas and subject matters that shape an artist’s ongoing project, shaping their practice through engagement with their local community. This not only fosters a meaningful viewer interaction with an artist’s work, but serves to make high quality arts programming accessible to a wider range of audiences. Many times, intersections will also directly respond to socio-political issues, providing a space in which community members can freely express themselves.

In addition to regularly scheduled programs, 18th Street has contributed to major programs throughout the LA area. In May 2019, the Center spearheaded the organizing of a campus-wide family-friendly festival event called the Pico Block Party. Stemming from the residency’s Culture Mapping initiative, this program aimed to celebrate cross-cultural exchange, art, and community in the Santa Monica Pico neighborhood. The festival featured numerous interactive performances, artist workshops, open studios, live music, exhibition tours, an array of LA-based food trucks, and other creative activities.

== Culture Mapping ==
=== Culture Mapping 90404 ===
Taking an unconventional approach to mapping, 18th Street Arts Center is committed to creating a community-produced map, highlighting the history and cultural assets of the area. They define cultural assets as “people, places, events, and organizations, both past and present, that serve as cultural anchors within the community according to the people that live there.” Working closely with the Quinn Research Center, 18th Street is responsible for the creation of Culture Mapping 90404, a project that serves to highlight the multifaceted stories of the Black community in the Pico neighborhood of Santa Monica that offer critical information about the history of the area. This project maintains a cognizance that the story of communities can never be fully told, but rather revealed over time in greater depth through various frameworks of understanding. To accurately map these experiences, 18th Street collaborates with a number of different organizations and members of the local community to document these assets and stories in an interactive website. Through this platform, users can access a Story Map, which offers information about the stories connecting the marked cultural assets, and a Pro Map, where users can gain more insight into the individual locations that represent cultural assets. By mapping the local area using a method that resonates with community members, the project eliminates harmful biases often present in mapping practices, drawing from the lived experiences of residents rather than the singular perspective of the map-maker. People also have the opportunity to suggest their own ideas for cultural assets, a feature that can be accessed on 18th Street’s website through an online form.

=== The Broadway Project ===
To further this mission, 18th Street Arts Center actively supports the Broadway Project, a long-term arts and culture project led by the Quinn Research Center. It strives to develop a Historic Broadway Cultural District that recognizes and celebrates the Black culture and history of Broadway Avenue between 14th and 20th Streets in Santa Monica. Once a lively hub of Black life, this stretch of Broadway witnessed the eventual displacement through eminent domain by Santa Monica city officials. Only vestiges of a thriving Black community that spans over a century remain, and the landmarks that exist do not neatly fit preservationsist standards. As an integral part of the Center’s culture mapping endeavor, this project seeks to mark and historicize the thriving Black culture and history that characterized the area for decades.

=== California Creative Corps ===
In addition, 18th Street Arts Center is also in the process of creating a statewide culture map through the California Creative Corps project, where they funded year-long fellowships for eighteen California artists to develop impactful arts and culture projects that foster community throughout the state. After an initial call for forty artists, to which over 375 applied, 42 applicants participated in a month-long series of professional development workshops led by 18th Street and partner organizations Clockshop, USC SLab, Healthy Places Index, and Rand Corporation. The chosen cohort of artists, announced in June of 2023, were determined through a final round of project proposal reviews, meaning each of their projects were selected for funding. Each finalist was awarded a production budget of up to $50,000 and a year-long salary of $65,000, medical and dental insurance at no cost, and the option to join 18th Street’s SIMPLE IRA plan with employer match for one year. The final projects will be documented in a California culture map, which will develop the essential infrastructure to ensure successful collaboration between arts and culture producers and community leaders seeking to foster well-being among neighbors at the local level.
