= Eric Mann =

American civil rights advocate

- Born: December 4, 1942 (age 83); Brooklyn, New York, US
- Education: Cornell University
- Known for: Congress of Racial Equality (Field Secretary); Students for a Democratic Society (New England Coordinator); Labor/Community Campaign to Keep GM Van Nuys Open (Lead Organizer); Labor/Community Strategy Center (Director); Weather Underground (Coordinator)
- Website: voicesfromthefrontlines.com

Eric Mann (born December 4, 1942) is a civil rights, anti-war, labor, and environmental organizer. He has worked with the Congress of Racial Equality, Newark Community Union Project, Students for a Democratic Society (SDS), the Black Panther Party, the United Automobile Workers (including eight years on auto assembly lines) and the New Directions Movement. He was also active as a leader of SDS faction the Weathermen, which later became the militant left-wing organization Weather Underground. He was arrested in September 1969 for participation in a direct action against the Harvard Center for International Affairs and sentenced to two years in prison on charges of conspiracy to commit murder after two bullets were fired through a window of the Cambridge police headquarters on November 8, 1969. He was instrumental in the movement that helped to keep a General Motors assembly plant in Van Nuys, California open for ten years. Mann has been credited for helping to shape the environmental justice movement in the U.S. He founded the Labor/Community Strategy Center in Los Angeles, California and has been its director for 25 years. In addition, Mann is founder and co-chair of the Bus Riders Union, which sued the Los Angeles County Metropolitan Transportation Authority for what it called “transit racism”, resulting in a precedent-setting civil rights lawsuit, Labor Community Strategy Center et al. v. MTA.

Mann is the author of books published by Beacon Press, Harper & Row and the University of California, which include Taking on General Motors; The Seven Components of Transformative Organizing Theory; and Playbook for Progressives: 16 Qualities of the Successful Organizer. He is known for his theory of transformative organizing and leadership of political movements and is acknowledged by many as an effective organizer. Mann is host of the weekly radio show Voices from the Frontlines: Your National Movement-Building Show on KPFK Pacifica Radio 90.7 in Los Angeles.

== Early life ==
Eric Mann was born December 4, 1942, in Brooklyn, New York, into a Jewish home rooted in what he described as "anti-fascist, working class, pro-union, pro-'Negro', internationalist, and socialist traditions." Both sides of his family were Jews who fled the Russian Empire during the anti-Semitic pogroms of the early 1900s.

== Background in social movements ==
=== Congress of Racial Equality (CORE) ===
In 1964 Mann graduated from Cornell University with a BA in Political Science and a minor in Industrial and Labor Relations. Organizers from the Student Non-Violent Coordinating Committee traveled to Cornell to recruit students into the civil rights movement and at 21 Mann went to work for the Congress of Racial Equality.

At CORE, Mann worked as field secretary for the Northeastern regional office on an anti-discrimination campaign against the Trailways Bus Company. Longtime Black and Latino porters had been refused job promotions; the workers were willing to lead the fight but wanted CORE's organizational support. The campaign included a regional boycott of Trailways, sit-ins at Trailways terminals, a demonstration at New York's Port Authority Bus Terminal and filing a civil rights complaint. According to The New York Times: "Eric Mann, the field secretary of CORE’s Northeastern regional office, said he and Miss Joyce Ware, another officer, had organized the demonstration 'to bring attention to our demands that the harassment of Negro and Puerto Rican employees be stopped'."

=== Students for a Democratic Society (SDS), Weathermen, Incarceration ===
In 1965, Mann joined the Newark Community Union Project (NCUP). Mann worked with organizers Bessie and Thurman Smith, Tom Hayden, 100 community members, and 10 students in door-to-door organizing in Newark’s Black South and Central wards where they engaged low-income people in movement-building, challenging slum housing and police brutality. He worked as a public school teacher at the Peshine Avenue School and was fired for demanding that Stokely Carmichael challenge a campus speaker from the Virginia Military Academy, for refusing to enforce what he described as repressive discipline on Black children, and for teaching sex education to eighth graders. The New York World Journal Tribune wrote that Mann put the school system on trial with 500 parents rallying to his defense.

Convinced by the Black Power movement to organize white students to support the civil rights and anti-war movements, Mann moved to Boston in 1968 to become New England Coordinator of SDS. In the spring of 1968, Mann played a leadership role in the Columbia University student strike led by SDS and the Black Student Union, demanding that Columbia shut down its Institute for Defense Analysis, and that it “integrate” the gymnasium, which allegedly only gave Blacks and Puerto Ricans limited access and a separate entrance.

As a regional coordinator for SDS, Mann organized and spoke at rallies at Boston University, the Massachusetts Institute of Technology, Harvard University, and other New England colleges. "The Columbia strike more than any other event in our history has given the radical student movement the belief that we can change this country", Mann said.

Mann was elected to the national committee of SDS in 1968. He told the Associated Press that he believed in "continuous resistance" against "institutions and policies of corporate capitalism" and that SDS chapters transition from campus protests groups to community groups that would guide students as a "de facto government."

When SDS splintered into three groups in 1969, Mann, then a leader in the SDS faction, the Weathermen (Weather Underground), adopted the Revolutionary Youth Movement’s belief that violent direct action should be used as a tactic to dismantle the group's perceived power centers of “US imperialism”. Mann and 20 others were arrested in September 1969 for participation in a direct action against the Harvard Center for International Affairs (CFIA), which the Revolutionary Youth Movement saw as a university-sponsored institution for counter-insurgency. Mann and 24 other Weathermen were charged with conspiracy to commit murder after two bullets were fired through a window of the police headquarters on November 8, 1969. Mann surrendered to the police on four counts stemming from the November 8 incident: conspiracy to commit murder, assault with intent to commit murder, promotion of anarchy, and threatening. Mann was sentenced to two years in prison of which he spent 18 months in the Middlesex House of Correction, Deer Island Prison, and Concord State Prison (with 40 days in solitary confinement).

From 1972 to 1974, Mann was a full-time journalist, writing for Boston After Dark, the Boston Phoenix, and The Boston Globe. He traveled to California to cover the prison movement and political trials; a three-part series in the Boston Phoenix led to his first book published by Harper & Row in 1974, Comrade George: An Investigation into the Life, Political Thought, and Assassination of George Jackson. At the Boston Globe, Mann co-wrote the column "Left Field Stands", with Howard Zinn.

=== United Auto Workers (UAW) Labor/Community Coalition to Keep GM Van Nuys Open ===
In 1975, Mann joined the Chicano-led August 29th Movement (ATM). ATM merged with Chinese-American organization I Wor Kuen (IWK) and the Black Revolutionary Communist League (RCL) to form the League of Revolutionary Struggle (LRS) in 1978.

Mann worked on automobile assembly lines as an active member of the United Auto Workers (UAW) and "transformative organizer" from 1978 to 1986, moving from the Ford assembly plant in Milpitas, California, to the General Motors assembly plant in South Gate, Los Angeles, California, to the General Motors plant in Van Nuys, California.

With plants facing imminent closings, Mann, with Mark Masaoka, and UAW Local 645 president Pete Beltran initiated a coalition between labor, the community, and the Campaign to Keep GM Van Nuys Open, which Mann chaired for ten years. Five thousand workers (50 percent Latino, 15 percent black, and 15 percent women) built the coalition in Black and Latino communities, where the members lived. Threatened with a boycott, GM kept the plant open for ten years. Reverend Frank Higgins Sr. described the negotiation of the labor/community coalition with GM president F. James McDonald, “For the first time they have seen a coalition form in this nation that would make them come to the table. They didn’t come to bargain; they came to deal with us as though we were children. They wound up leaving knowing they had a tiger by the tail!”

While at GM, Mann was active in the New Directions Movement, a national UAW reform group founded by Jerry Tucker in 1986. New Directions opposed the UAW's collaboration with Ford, GM and Chrysler, its support of anti-Japanese protectionism, and its support of “labor-management cooperation”.

=== Environmental Justice and the Labor/Community Strategy Center (LCSC) ===
In 1989, Mann, Father Luis Olivares, Reverend Frank Higgins, Rudy Acuña and other Black and Latino leaders initiated the Labor/Community Strategy Center (LCSC) as a “think tank/act tank” that would train organizers and organize labor, environmental justice, mass transportation, and civil rights campaigns.

In the early environmental work of the LCSC, Mann's approach distinguished environmental justice organizing from the approach of the mainstream environmental movement. According to reviewer Barry Commoner, Mann's 1992 book L.A.’s Lethal Air, documented how class, race, and gender were the unspoken categories of environmental injustice.

In 1993, after the 1992 Los Angeles riots, Mann, as principal author with the Urban Strategies Group, wrote Reconstructing Los Angeles and U.S. Cities from the Bottom Up. This document linked transportation, the environment, and unemployment, advocating for rebuilding the manufacturing sector through “environmentally-sound production of technologies, focusing on solar electricity, non-polluting, prefabricated housing materials, electric car components, and public transportation vehicles, both buses and trains”—and called for "the social justice state not the police state". Prompted by the LCSC's efforts, the South Coast Air Quality Management District implemented a “right to know” statute in which community residents were given information about the chemicals they were exposed to and the corporations that were producing them.

In 1992, Mann and the Strategy Center founded the Bus Riders Union (BRU) with a group of Black and Latino bus riders and started organizing on the buses of Los Angeles. Working with the National Association for the Advancement of Colored People Legal Defense and Educational Fund (LDF), with Mann as chief negotiator, the BRU crafted a civil rights lawsuit based on Title VI of the Civil Rights Act of 1964 (which prevents discrimination by government agencies that receive federal funds).

The BRU charged the Los Angeles County Metropolitan Transportation Authority with “transit racism”—setting up a separate and unequal transit system in which Latino and Black bus riders were subject to "a third class bus system for Third World people" while wealthy contractors built rail projects for a whiter, more affluent ridership. The BRU's “billions for buses” campaign was initiated in 1992. Sit-ins, grassroots organizing, a “no seat, no fare campaign,” court orders, and negotiations with the MTA led by Mann, resulted in a ten-year civil rights consent decree committing the Los Angeles MTA to revamp and improve its bus system. The BRU was designated the class representative for LA's 500,000 bus riders (of whom 50 percent were Latino and 25 percent were Black). A BRU team of Eric Mann, Chris Mathis, Norma Henry, and Della Bonner worked in a "joint working group" with MTA representatives that led to replacing 2,000 diesel buses, with 2,500 new compressed natural gas buses. This story is documented in the Haskell Wexler film Bus Riders Union.

In the early 2000s, Mann helped lead the Community Rights Campaign which took up the cause of serving the transportation needs of minority students in the Los Angeles Unified School District, which it linked with "transit racism". It used the slogan of "1,000 more buses, 1,000 more schools and 1,000 fewer police", addressing what it saw as the impacts of structural racism on minority students in the Los Angeles Unified School District. Led by the Strategy Center's organizer Manuel Criollo, community rights organizers built a student pass campaign that in 2005 resulted in the LA MTA eliminating the application process, which had been limiting students’ access to low cost student passes. This was followed by the student organizing project called "Stop the Schools as Pre-Prisons". This campaign produced numerous reports and helped lead to the rolling back of truancy tickets and charges of willful defiance, as maintained in Mann's disquisition Black, Brown, and Overpoliced in 2014.

Since 2012, the work of Mann and the Strategy Center has focused on the "Fight for the Soul of the Cities" campaign. According to Mann, it opposes privatization, pollution, policing and corporate interests and proposes cities putting the Black and Latino working class as its core.

Mann led the founding of the National School for Strategic Organizing that educates and trains future leaders. The school has recruited and trained more than 100 young organizers, who are active in social movements. Based on his experiences, Mann wrote Playbook for Progressives, which presents his theory of transformative organizing.

From 2002 to the present he has been the host of KPFK Pacifica's “Voices from the Frontlines—your national movement building show.”

== List of works ==
=== Books ===
- 1974: ’’Comrade George: An Investigation into the Life, Political Thought, and Assassination of George Jackson’’ Harper & Row, ISBN 978-0060803186
- 1987: Taking on General Motors: A Case Study of the UAW Campaign to Keep GM Van Nuys Open University of California Institute of Labor Studies, ISBN 978-0892151417
- 1991: L.A.’s Lethal Air: New Strategies for Policy, Organizing, and Action, Mann with the WATCHDOG Organizing Committee Strategy Center Publications, ISBN 978-0962981302
- 1996: A New Vision for Urban Transportation Labor/Community Strategy Center
- 2002: Dispatches from Durban: Firsthand Commentaries on the World Conference Against Racism and Post-September 11 Movement Strategies Frontlines Press, ISBN 978-0972126304
- 2004: The 2004 Presidential Elections: A Turning Point for the U.S. Left Frontlines Press, ASIN: B0028GCE44
- 2006: Katrina’s Legacy: White Racism and Black Reconstruction in New Orleans and the Gulf Coast Frontlines Press, ISBN 978-0972126328
- 2010: The 7 Components of Transformative Organizing Theory Frontlines Press
- 2011: Playbook for Progressives: The 16 Qualities of the Successful Organizer Beacon Press, ISBN 978-0-8070-4735-4

=== Selected chapters and articles in edited publications ===
- 1968: "Students and their Universities", AmMannan Now John G. Kirk, ed.1968
- 1971: "Appraisals and Perspectives: Strategy for the Student Movement", University Crisis Reader (Vol II) Emmanuel Wallerstein and Paul Starr, eds. 1971
- 1986: "Keeping GM Van Nuys Open: Regional Economic Planning from the Bottom Up", Midwest Center for Labor Research Review Fall 1986
- 1990: "Labor/Community Coalitions as a Tactic for Labor Insurgency", Building Bridges: New Strategies for Labor Jeremy Brecher and Tim Costello, eds., 1990
- 1996: "Rights Theory, Social Movements, and the Courts", Political Science Association's Law and Courts Quarterly Summer 1996.
- 1997: "Confronting Transit Racism in Los Angeles", Just Transportation: Dismantling Race and Class Barriers to Mobility Robert Bullard and Glen Johnson, ed., 1997
- 1998: “Class, Community, and Empire: Toward an Anti-imperialist Strategy for Labor”, Rising from the Ashes? Labor in the Age of “Global” Capitalism 1998.
- 1998: “Keeping GM Van Nuys Open”, Reshaping the US Left: Popular Struggles in the 1980s Mike Davis and Michael Sprinker eds., 1998
- 1999: "Class, Community and Empire: Towards an Anti-Imperialist Strategy for Labor", Rising from the Ashes? Labor in the Age of Global Capitalism eds. Ellen Meiksins Wood, 1999
- 1999: "Radical Social Movements and the Responsibility of Progressive Intellectuals", Loyola of Los Angeles Law Review April 1999
- 2001: “Building the Anti-Racist, Anti-Imperialist United Front: Lesson from L.A. Labor/Community Strategy Center and Bus Riders Union’’ in "Blacks and Asians: Rebuilding Radical Formations"Souls, a Journal of Black Culture, Politics and Society, Manning Marable, ed., Spring 2001
- 2001: "A Race Struggle, a Class Struggle, a Women’s Struggle All at the Same Time: Organizing on the Buses of Los Angeles", Working Classes, Global Realities, Socialist Register vol. 37, Leo Panitch, ed.
- 2012: "Fair Play: Transit Rights Are Civil Rights for L.A.’s Bus Riders", Yes! August 23, 2012
- 2013: "Fight for the Soul of the City: The Battle Over Buses in Los Angeles", The Nation, May 27, 2013.

=== Documentaries ===
- 1986: Tiger by the Tail, produced and directed by Michael Goldman, written by Eric Mann, narrated by Ed Asner: a documentary film of the Campaign to Keep GM Van Nuys Open
- 1997: Voices from the Front Lines: Covering five years of environmental justice organizing, the film features the work of the Labor/Community Strategy Center and its delegates’ trip to Accion Ecologica in Ecuador to unite their common struggles against the Texaco Corporation.
- 2000: Bus Riders’ Union, co-directed by Haskell Wexler and Johanna Demetrakis,: documentary on the Bus Riders Union, featuring Eric Mann as director of the Labor/Community Strategy Center.
