= Hockenberry =

Hockenberry is a surname and can refer to:

- Charles Hockenberry (1918–2007), American athlete and coach
- Chuck Hockenbery (born 1950), American baseball pitcher
- John Hockenberry (born 1956), American journalist, author, commentator, and activist
  - Hockenberry (talk show), an American television show hosted by John Hockenberry
