= Tanzina Vega =

American journalist

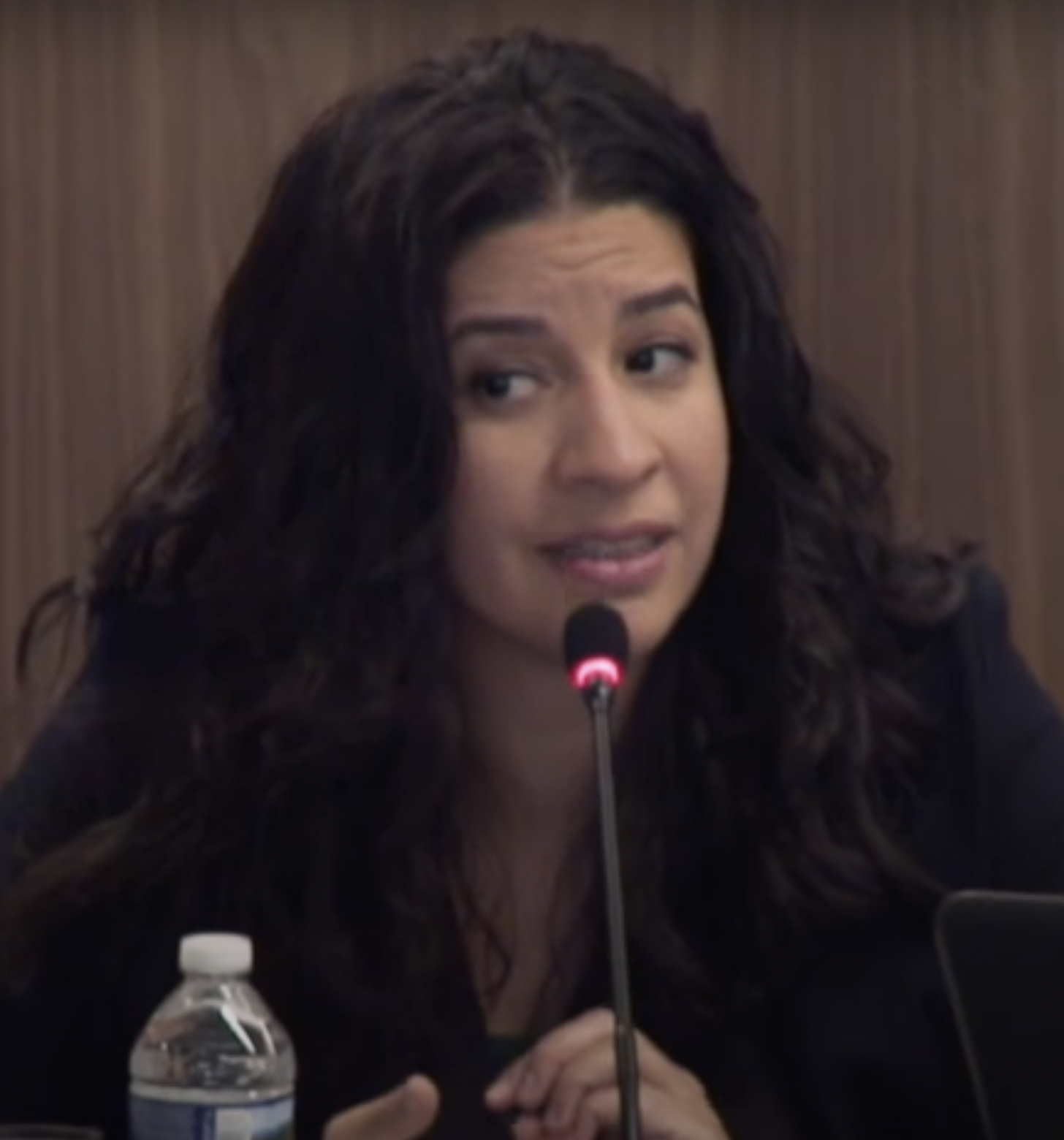
Vega in 2016

Tanzina Vega is an American journalist whose positions have ranged from weekday host of The Takeaway, a public radio show, to CNNMoney national reporter for race and inequality in America, to staff reporter at The New York Times, where she created and covered a beat on race and ethnicity for the national desk, as well as reporting for the metro section and business desk.

== Background, education and early career ==
Vega was born in New York City. She identifies as a Latina of Puerto Rican ancestry. Vega grew up with her parents and brother on Manhattan's Lower East Side. Though they lived in public housing and were poor, both of her parents earned master's degrees.

Vega attended Stony Brook University on Long Island, funding her education in part with scholarship assistance from the I Have a Dream Foundation, and by working multiple jobs. Vega's major was sociology with a minor in women's studies and Latin/American/Caribbean studies. She graduated in 1996.

== Professional journalism career ==
In 2010, Vega was part of a team of New York Times journalists that won an Emmy Award for the documentary film "One in 8 Million," about the individual stories of New Yorkers. In 2013, Vega persuaded Jill Abramson, then the executive editor of The New York Times, to assign her as a national reporter on the newly-created race and ethnicity beat.

In this position, Vega covered the unrest in Ferguson, Missouri following the shooting death of Michael Brown, produced a series of video interviews of minority comedians, and covered microaggressions on college campuses. In 2015, her job title was eliminated, and she was reassigned to the metro desk to cover courthouses in the Bronx. She soon left the newspaper for CNN, again covering issues related to social inequality, racial justice and the criminal justice system.

In 2017, Vega was a visiting lecturer at Princeton University, teaching a course called "The Media and Social Issues: Reporting on Race in America Today". She was also an Eisner Fellow at The Nation Institute.

In March, 2018, Vega was hired by WNYC and Public Radio International as the weekday host of The Takeaway, a morning news show. The show's previous host, John Hockenberry, had retired in 2017 amid accusations of harassing female colleagues. At its height, around 280 radio stations carried The Takeaway. As The Takeaway's host, Vega emphasized coverage of race and inequality.

In 2019, Vega won the 15th annual Robert G. McGruder Distinguished Guest Lecture Award for media diversity at Kent State University.

After three years as host, Vega resigned from The Takeaway on July 23, 2021, amid an internal investigation into allegations that she berated staff and was the subject of internal complaints. Melissa Harris Perry succeeded her as host.

In 2022, Vega was the host of Across Colors, a limited series podcast about parents and educators across the country who are trying to improve social and racial equity in schools. Vega currently writes for The Boston Globe and is an advisory board member for City Limits.
