= Public Radio International =

American radio organization (1983–2019)

- Formerly: American Public Radio (1983–1994)
- Type: Public radio network
- Founded: April 15, 1983; 43 years ago
- Founder: William Hugh Kling
- Defunct: 2019; 7 years ago
- Fate: Merged into Public Radio Exchange
- Headquarters: Minneapolis, Minnesota, U.S.
- Area served: United States
- Key people: Marguerite Hoffman (Chairman); Alisa Miller (President and CEO)
- Revenue: 16,134,095 United States dollar (2017)
- Total assets: 6,485,118 United States dollar (2022)
- Parent: WGBH Educational Foundation (2012–2018)

Public Radio International (PRI) was an American public radio organization. Headquartered in Minneapolis, Minnesota, PRI provided programming to over 850 public radio stations in the United States.

PRI was one of the main providers of programming for public radio stations in the U.S., alongside National Public Radio, American Public Media, and the Public Radio Exchange. PRI merged with the Public Radio Exchange in 2018.

== Background ==
In the United States, PRI distributed well-known programming to public radio stations. Among its programs were the global news program The World, which PRI co-produced with WGBH Boston. Programs on PRI—sometimes mis-attributed to National Public Radio—were produced by a variety of organizations, including PRI in the United States and other countries. PRI, along with NPR and American Public Media, was one of the largest program producers and distributors of public radio programming in the United States. PRI offered over 280 hours of programming each week to stations and listeners. Public Radio International said its mission was to "serve audiences as a distinctive content source for information, insights and cultural experiences essential to living in our diverse, interconnected world."

Approximately 850 radio station affiliates and other audio venues broadcast, streamed and downloaded PRI programs. According to the 2017 Nielsen Audio ratings, 8.1 million people listened to PRI programming each week.

PRI's programs won awards for quality and innovation, including the DuPont-Columbia Award, Scripps Howard Award for Excellence in Electronic Media/Radio, George M. Foster Peabody Award, Golden Reel Award and Gabriel Award.

PRI programming received funding from station fees, corporate underwriting, and individual and corporate grants. Less than 2% of the overall operating budget came from United States government agencies.

== History ==
PRI was founded in 1983 as American Public Radio as an alternative to NPR for public radio program distribution. Five stations established American Public Radio as a syndicate: the Minnesota Public Radio network, KQED in San Francisco, WNYC in New York City, WGUC in Cincinnati, and KUSC in Los Angeles. The corporation changed its name to Public Radio International in 1994 to reflect its growing interest and involvement in international audio publishing, as typified by its many collaborations with the BBC.

In the mid-1990s, PRI began to expand its reach by producing programming in addition to distributing programming. This evolution in the company began with PRI's The World, originally a co-production among PRI, the BBC World Service, and WGBH.

In 2004, Minnesota Public Radio left PRI and began distributing its own shows (including A Prairie Home Companion and Marketplace and excluding Classical 24) through its newly created arm, American Public Media. In 2012, PRI was acquired by the WGBH Educational Foundation.

Public Radio International and Public Radio Exchange merged in 2018. Both networks maintained separate identities and programming until 2019, when the Public Radio International branding was retired. In 2020, the last remaining PRI program other than The World, Studio 360, aired its last episode, concluding with the PRI network identification.

== Recent program launches and firsts ==
In 1995: PRI launches Classical 24, public radio's first 24-hour classical music service, as a co-production with Minnesota Public Radio.

In 1996: PRI's The World premieres, presenting issues and events "through a global lens" to American audiences. Co-produced by PRI with BBC World Service and WGBH Radio Boston, it was the first daily news co-production ever undertaken by the BBC.

In 2001: PRI’s Studio 360 launches.

In September, PRI and Symphony Space of New York City announced that PRI would become the national distribution partner of Selected Shorts; the program had previously been distributed by National Public Radio.

In January 2008, PRI and WNYC announced that the name of their new morning drive news program is The Takeaway with John Hockenberry and Adaora Udoji. This program's editorial partners include The BBC World Service, The New York Times, and WGBH Radio Boston. The program successfully launched April 28, and full national launch was expected June/July 2008.

On May 1, 2008, PRI was the first major public media outlet to use digital cinema; and one of the first mass media companies overall. PRI conceived and spearheaded This American Life Live! in partnership with Ira Glass and WBEZ Chicago. This American Life Live! was presented exclusively in select theatres by National CineMedia's (NCM) Fathom, in partnership with BY Experience and Chicago Public Radio, and in association with Public Radio International.

In 2012: PRI was acquired by WGBH.

On March 21, 2014, the company announced the agreement to distribute This American Life would end July 1, 2014.

In 2017, PRI launched its Engagement Lab.

== Relationship with NPR ==
Public radio is a generic term for non-commercial radio stations or programming that are covered under the Public Broadcasting Act. Public radio organizations receive funding from corporate sponsors, public (e.g., Corporation for Public Broadcasting) and private foundation grants as well as donations and gifts from individuals. The mix of revenue differs by station, network and/or producer. PRI, NPR and American Public Media are the largest providers of public radio programming in the United States. They compete with each other for slots on public radio stations and the attention of listeners. Each has distinct missions and emphases in programming—PRI is focused on global journalism, providing diverse voices, and arts and cultural perspectives. Any given public radio station may be simultaneously both an NPR member and an affiliate of PRI and APM. PRI is a not-for-profit organization that has an independent governing board with an independent board of directors. NPR is a membership organization; its board is composed of public radio stations which run for seats on the board.

PRI was a younger organization than NPR, and focused on pushing the sound of public radio forward through innovative programming strategies and leading media in its areas of focus—global news and cultural perspectives. (NPR was founded in 1970 and PRI in 1983.) Many PRI shows drew a younger overall audience than shows produced by NPR. PRI's stated purpose was to offer a wider range of voices than NPR programs.

In recent years, numerous programs have changed distributors. Some programs that were formerly distributed by PRI, such as A Prairie Home Companion, Marketplace, and American Routes, along with the BBC World Service, are now distributed by American Public Media. APM was formed by Minnesota Public Radio to distribute programs it owned and produced, thereby moving distribution from PRI to APM.

In addition, PRI distributed World Cafe for many years. However, in 2005, the show's distribution was switched to NPR. At the same time, PRI has also picked up the distribution of programs originally distributed by NPR, including Michael Feldman's Whad'Ya Know?, and, in 2006, Living on Earth—public radio's leading news and information program focused on the environment. In September 2007, PRI became the national distributor of Selected Shorts, which was previously distributed by NPR.

In January 2014, PRI became the national distributor of Science Friday, also previously distributed by NPR. On April 11, 2018, distribution of the show changed hands once more when it went from PRI to WNYC Studios.

== See also ==
- List of United States radio networks
- Public Broadcasting Service
