= Udoji =

Udoji is a surname. Notable people with the surname include:

- Adaora Udoji (born 1967), American journalist and producer
- Chigozie Udoji (born 1986), Nigerian footballer
- Chinedu Udoji (1989–2018), Nigerian footballer
- Jerome Udoji (1912–2010), Nigerian businessman
