= The Takeaway =

Morning radio news program

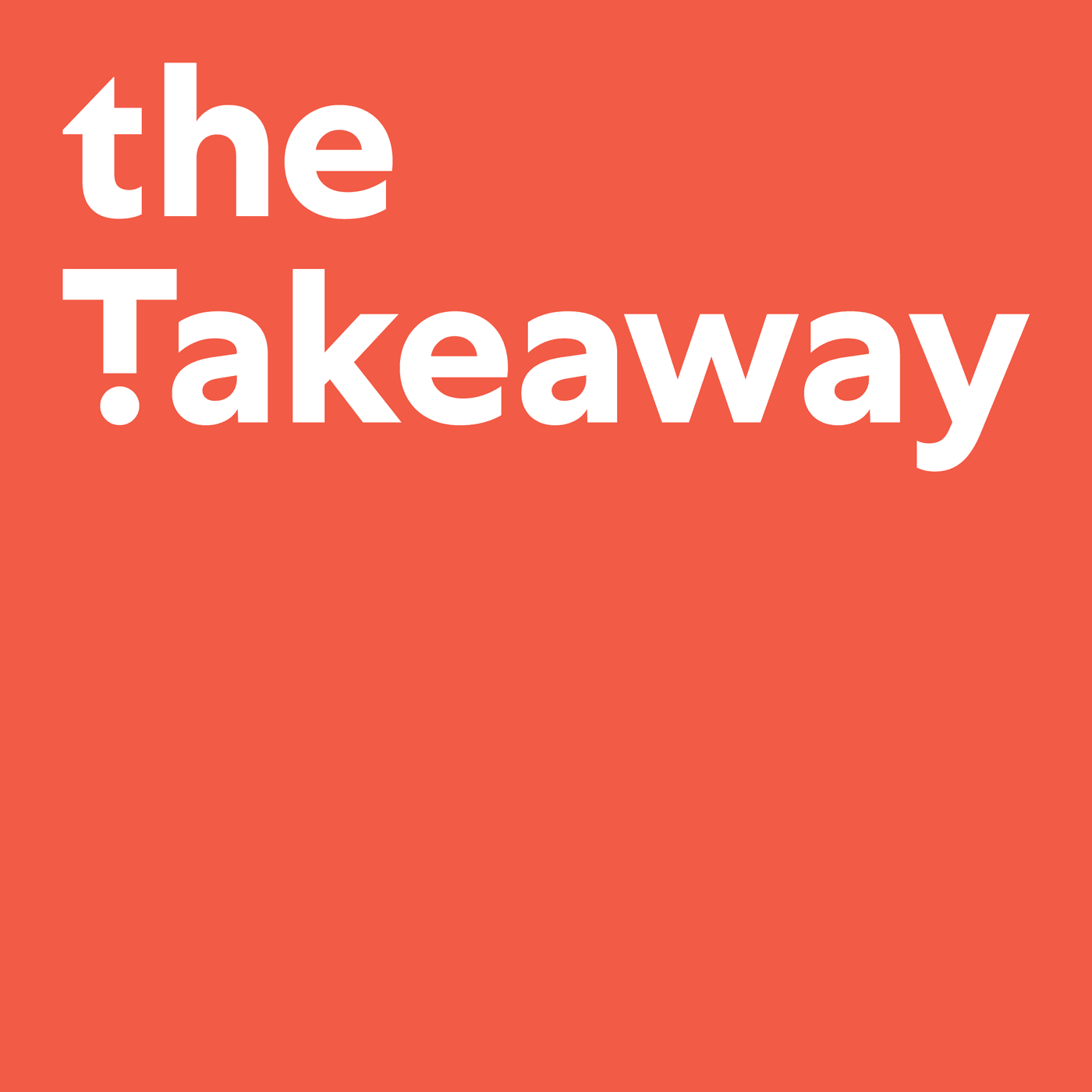
- Genre: News: Global news, National USA News, analysis, commentary, interviews, discussion, perspectives, breaking news, UG content
- Country of origin: United States
- Language: English
- Home station: WNYC New York Public Radio
- Syndicates: Public Radio Exchange
- Hosted by: Melissa Harris-Perry
- Created by: PRI Public Radio International & WNYC New York Public Radio
- Executive producer: Lee Hill
- Recording studio: New York, NY
- Original release: April 28, 2008 – June 2, 2023
- Audio format: Stereophonic
- Website: www.thetakeaway.org
- Podcast: feeds.wnyc.org/thetakeaway

The Takeaway was a weekday radio news program co-created and co-produced by Public Radio International and WNYC. Its editorial partner was GBH; at launch the BBC World Service and The New York Times were also editorial partners. In addition to co-producing the program, PRX also distributed the program nationwide to its affiliated stations. The program debuted on WNYC in New York, WGBH in Boston, and WEAA in Baltimore. At time of its last broadcast, the program had approximately 241 carrying stations across the country, including markets in New York, Los Angeles, Chicago, San Francisco, Miami, Portland, Boston, and more.

The show had several permanent hosts since its inception in 2008, sometimes with a single host, other times with two hosts. The program began with two co-hosts Adaora Udoji and John Hockenberry. Celeste Headlee replaced Udoji to become the second permanent co-host of The Takeaway. After Headlee left, Hockenberry remained the solo host for the next five years; he was eventually replaced by Tanzina Vega. After Vega's hosting tenure, Melissa Harris-Perry took over hosting duties until the show's end in 2023.

On February 17, 2023 WNYC and PRX announced that The Takeaway had been cancelled. The last episode aired on June 2, 2023.

== Mission ==
The program's stated intent was to deliver "national and international news and cultural stories through a conversational and unprecedented personality-driven format." The program launched on April 28, 2008, initially airing in two separate live feeds—from 6 am to 7 am on WNYC 93.9 FM and from 8 to 9 am on AM 820.

On January 25, 2010, as part of WNYC-FM's new schedule the show was moved to WNYC-AM, a later hour, and expanded to four hours. On September 3, 2012, the show was reduced to one hour.

The program has received major philanthropic support from The John S. and James L. Knight Foundation, the Corporation for Public Broadcasting, the Bill & Melinda Gates Foundation, Rockefeller Foundation, and the Skoll Foundation.

== Presenters ==
The show initially launched with broadcasters Adaora Udoji and John Hockenberry as co-hosts. Udoji left the show after eight months. Over the course of several months in 2009, The Takeaway featured various guest co-hosts, including journalist Farai Chideya, WDET news director Jerome Vaughn; television presenters Daljit Dhaliwal and Lynn Sherr; and broadcast journalists Katherine Lanpher and Celeste Headlee. In addition, staffers Femi Oke and Todd Zwillich also guest-hosted. After several stints as guest co-host, Headlee joined the show as permanent co-host September 21, 2009 until her departure August 17, 2012.

Hockenberry anchored until August 2017, stepping down without an appointed replacement. Todd Zwillich served as an interim host.

On March 27, 2018, it was announced that Tanzina Vega, formerly of CNN and The New York Times, would be the new host of The Takeaway. Vega started hosting the program on May 7, 2018. Later that year, Amy Walter, of the Cook Political Report, joined as Friday host.

On July 23, 2021, Vega announced her departure from The Takeaway and WNYC. Melissa Harris-Perry was named as interim host following Tanzina Vega's departure.

On October 18, 2021, Harris-Perry was named permanent host and managing editor of the program.

== Format ==
With the program's debut, public radio had more than one program available throughout the morning drive across time zones for the first time. The format of the program was influenced by discussions at the Stanford Joint Program in Design. It has a different tone and approach from NPR's Morning Edition, delivering national and international news and cultural stories through a conversational and personality-driven format rather than a magazine, packaged pieces format like Morning Edition. The web presence of the program allows listeners to respond immediately to news and participate in editorial decision-making, as well as building a significant online community around the content.

Effective September 2012, with an expiration of a Corporation for Public Broadcasting grant and limited uptake at public radio stations, The Takeaway was reduced to one hour, feeding at 9 am Eastern with an updated hour feeding at 12 noon Eastern for the Pacific Time Zone and midday Eastern markets. WGBH Boston airs the program every weekday at 10 am and 2 pm Eastern.

The difference between the expectations of public radio listeners and the tone of the program initially led to a negative response from some listeners. However, a 2012 study noted that the program had succeeded in attracting a more diverse audience, with African American listenership exceeding public radio averages by 60%. The show also received multiple awards, including The Corporation for Public Broadcasting's Community Lifeline Award (shared with WNYC for coverage of Hurricane Sandy in 2012) and the 2011 Radio and Television Digital News Association/UNITY Award (for their series "Fluid Identities").

== Controversies ==
In 2011, The Takeaway dismissed part-time freelancer Caitlin Curran, after she had participated in the Occupy Wall Street protests. According to WNYC's company guidelines: "Individuals may not participate in an advocacy manner in events involving causes or issues that New York Public Radio covers or may cover." At the time, The Takeaway was covering the protests extensively. The dismissal was widely criticized.

On December 1, 2017, New York magazine published journalist Suki Kim's story alleging that John Hockenberry had created a toxic work environment for his co-hosts and lower-level co-workers and had even crossed the line of sexual harassment. In WNYC's own reporting about the story, journalist Ilya Marritz stated that four women had "approached WNYC News to say they recently filed harassment complaints with the station and have been dissatisfied with the response from human resources." In the wake of these revelations former host Adaora Udoji published an editorial in U.S. online edition of The Guardian, describing her experience as "an excruciating, painful ride that would haunt me nearly 10 years later."

Five days after the Hockenberry story was published in New York magazine, WNYC suspended two of their best known hosts, Leonard Lopate and Jonathan Schwartz pending investigations into "inappropriate conduct". Two weeks later WNYC announced that both hosts had been fired for violating WNYC's "standards for providing an inclusive, appropriate, and respectful work environment."

On January 26, 2018, WNYC announced that Chief Content Officer Dean Cappello would no longer oversee WNYC News and WNYC Studios, nor would he oversee any direct reports.

The cancellation of The Takeaway was mired in controversy. WNYC cited the expensive nature of producing a daily radio program, as well as a decline in the listening audience. They noted that the carriage of the program on public radio stations across the United States has dropped 13% in the last several years. New York Public Radio CEO LaFontaine Oliver cited a $7 million deficit for the company in 2023. Members of the NYPR employees' union countered by pointing out that executive compensation had remained completely intact at an estimated $1.85 million.
