= HEAT with John Hockenberry =

HEAT with John Hockenberry was an independently produced American radio program hosted by John Hockenberry. The show aired from February through October 1990. It won a Peabody Award in 1991.

== History ==
In 1986 Brad Spear at WGBH began developing a program with Murray Street Production in the wake of new radio funding from the Corporation for Public Broadcasting. In August of that year, HEAT of the Night with Marty Goldenson premiered. In 1988, the National Endowment for the Arts Media Program made its largest radio grant that year toward further production of HEAT. National Public Radio (NPR) committed to providing the balance with significant support of the John D. and Catherine T. MacArthur Foundation.

In late 1989, HEAT with John Hockenberry premiered on NPR. The New York Times described it as "an innovative mix of public affairs segments and performances," but the show was canceled after about one year. Creator Steve Rathe of Murray Street said, "The recession came along, and the network wasn't finding the underwriting dollars they had committed to."
