= Edgewise =

- Starring: John Hockenberry
- Country of origin: United States

Production
- Running time: 1 hour

Original release
- Network: MSNBC
- Release: December 24, 1996 – July 22, 1997

Edgewise is an hour-long television news magazine program that aired on MSNBC from 1996 to 1997. The show was hosted by John Hockenberry.

The show aired on Saturday evenings. In one notable episode with David Brinkley, the journalist was critical of President Bill Clinton. In July 1997, it was reported the show would be canceled. It ran until Labor Day of that year.
