= Violence Initiative =

The Violence Initiative was a proposal for research into reducing violence in American inner cities, first announced on February 11, 1992 at a meeting of the National Mental Health Advisory Council by psychiatrist Frederick K. Goodwin, then director of the Alcohol, Drug Abuse, and Mental Health Administration. It was initially proposed as a large-scale program of research into inner-city violence, with the intent of identifying children and youth believed to be biologically or genetically pre-disposed to violence. Goodwin further suggested that future research possibilities might include interventions and targeted treatments in order to divert these youth from possible future violence.

The proposal drew public controversy after portions of Goodwin's speech which compared inner-city youth to primates in the jungle were leaked publicly. The remarks were initially publicized by Peter Breggin, an outspoken opponent of psychiatric medication and biological explanations of crime. Goodwin first apologized for the primate remarks in an interview on February 21, calling them "insensitive and careless." He resigned from his position on February 27, 1992.

Further controversy arose when Breggin drew a connection between the Violence Initiative and Goodwin's earlier research into the use of psychiatric drugs as a means of controlling violent behavior, ultimately suggesting that the Violence Initiative would result in widespread use of psychiatric drugs to control the behavior of inner-city minority youth. Critics denounced the proposal as racist and called for it to be cancelled. Supporters of the proposal countered that the proposal had been a legitimate research topic, and had become a victim of "political correctness."

== Primate comparison ==
Goodwin's controversial remarks drew a direct comparison between inner-city youth and male monkeys in the wild:

If you look, for example, at male monkeys, especially in the wild, roughly half of them survive to adulthood. The other half die by violence. That is the natural way it is for males, to knock each other off and in fact, there are some interesting evolutionary implications of that because the same hyperaggressive monkeys who kill each other are also hypersexual, so they copulate more to offset the fact that more of them are dying. Now, one could say that if some of the loss of social structure in this society, and particularly within the high impact inner-city areas, has removed some of the civilizing evolutionary things that we have built up and that may be it isn't just the careless use of the word when people call certain areas of certain cities jungles, that we may have gone back to what might be more natural, without all the social controls that we have imposed upon ourselves as a civilization over thousands of years in our evolution.

These remarks were described as "rambling" by the Washington Post during the initial controversy. In a 1995 article, the New Yorker characterized his logic as "obscure" and "not entirely clear"; the same article reported Goodwin stating that he had made the remarks "impromptu - and after a wholly sleepless night".

The comparison of inner-city youth to primates, accompanied by the use of the word "jungle", was widely viewed as racist. Writer Tom Wolfe, though sympathetic to Goodwin's argument, criticized the comparison. In his 1996 essay "Sorry, But Your Soul Just Died", relating broadly to the effects of technology on the human soul, that this "may have been the stupidest single word uttered by an American public official in the year 1992".
