= Frederick K. Goodwin =

American psychiatrist (1936–2020)

- Born: April 21, 1936; Cincinnati, Ohio
- Died: September 10, 2020 (aged 84)
- Occupations: Psychiatrist, Research professor
- Notable work: Manic-Depressive Illness
- Spouse(s): Rosemary Goodwin, MSW (married 1963)
- Website: http://drgoodwin.com

Frederick King Goodwin (April 21, 1936 – September 10, 2020) was an American psychiatrist and Clinical Professor of Psychiatry at the George Washington University Medical Center, where he was also director of the Center on Neuroscience, Medical Progress, and Society. He was a specialist in bipolar disorder (also known as manic-depressive illness) and recurrent depression.

== Life and career ==
Goodwin was born in Cincinnati, Ohio. He received a B.S. from Georgetown University in 1958 and his M.D. from St. Louis University in 1963, and was a psychiatric resident at the University of North Carolina in Chapel Hill. In 1965, Goodwin joined the National Institute of Mental Health (NIMH) and served as NIMH Scientific Director and Chief of Intramural Research from 1981 to 1988. He was the first to report a controlled study on the effects of lithium on bipolar disorder.

He was a member of the Institute of Medicine of the National Academy of Sciences and a fellow of the ACNP. He was a founder of the journal Psychiatry Research, and on the editorial boards of a number of other journals.

Goodwin received major research awards in his field including the Hofheimer Prize from the American Psychiatric Association, the International Anna-Monika Prize for Research in Depression, the Edward A. Strecker Award, the Nola Maddox Falcone Prize from NARSAD (now known as the Brain & Behavior Research Foundation), the McAlpin Research Award from the National Mental Health Association, the Distinguished Service Award from the National Alliance on Mental Illness (NAMI), and the Research Award from the American Foundation for Suicide Prevention. He was the first to be named Psychiatrist of the Year by Psychiatric Times, and the first recipient of the Fawcett Humanitarian Award of the NDMDA (now the Depression and Bipolar Support Alliance. Goodwin was one of only five psychiatrists on the Current Contents list of the most frequently cited scientists in the world and one of 12 listed in The Best Doctors in the U.S.

Another focus of Goodwins' research was SAD (seasonal affective disorder), a form of depression for which he enthusiastically endorsed the use of light therapy to help combat its debilitating effects.

In July 1988, Goodwin was appointed by then-Vice President George H. W. Bush to head ADAMHA, the Alcohol, Drug Abuse, and Mental Health Administration,

=== Media scandal ===
In 1992 Goodwin was forced to resign from his post at ADAMHA following controversy over his "Violence Initiative". He had used the word "monkey" in the text of one of his slides during a presentation on inner-city youth, and in accompanying remarks he compared their behavior to that of primates: "If you look, for example, at male monkeys, especially in the wild, roughly half of them survive to adulthood. The other half die by violence. ... the same hyperaggressive monkeys who kill each other are also hypersexual ... maybe it isn't just the careless use of the word when people call certain areas of certain cities jungles" (quoted in Medical Apartheid). His remarks created a storm of controversy and attacks by other scientists within NIMH. The press and Congress eventually forced Goodwin out as director of ADMHA. A short time after the media scandal, he was reprimanded in the form of being appointed by then DHHS Secretary Sullivan, to head NIMH, a small step down. He served in that capacity from 1992 until his resignation in 1994.

=== Later career ===
After retiring from government, Goodwin was actively involved in educating other psychiatrists through continuing medical education (CME) programs and pharmaceutical speakers' bureaus.

In 1998 Goodwin was elected president of the Psychiatric Research Society. Goodwin hosted the award-winning radio show The Infinite Mind. Started in 1997, the show (which at its height aired on over 300 public radio stations throughout the country), won more than 30 journalism awards over 10 years and was considered “public radio’s most honored and listened to health and science program."

== Pharmaceutical company links ==
The 2007 second edition of Goodwin's Manic Depressive Illness notes in its Acknowledgements that:

During the time that this book was in preparation, Dr. Goodwin received research support from George Washington University Medical Center, the Foundation for Education and Research on Mental Illness, the Dalio Family Foundation, GlaxoSmithKline, Pfizer, Eli Lilly, and Solvay. He has received honoraria from GlaxoSmithKline, Pfizer, Solvay, and Eli Lilly and unrestricted educational grants to support the production of this book from Abbott Laboratories, AstraZeneca, Bristol Meyers Squibb, Forest Laboratories, GlaxoSmithKline, Janssen, Eli Lilly, Pfizer, and Sanofi".

Goodwin was also on the board of directors of the Center for Medicine in the Public Interest, which the online magazine Slate described as an "industry-funded front ... which receives a majority of its funding from drug companies".

=== The Infinite Mind ===
An article in The New York Times (Nov. 21, 2008) said that Goodwin had hosted segments of the National Public Radio program The Infinite Mind that recommended the use of drugs without disclosing that he had received over a million dollars from their manufacturers.

Bill Lichtenstein, the senior executive producer of the show, said that Goodwin had not disclosed payments from pharmaceutical companies, in violation of a strict conflict of interest contract. Goodwin said that Lichtenstein was aware of his educational speaking and consulting activities for pharmaceutical companies, and that in 2005 Goodwin had switched to guest host and let Peter D. Kramer host other shows, including those discussing psychopharmacological treatment, for that reason. An assistant producer of The Infinite Mind independently supported Goodwin's claim. However, 'On The Media' later issued an apology for not contacting Lichtenstein, who reports that when he himself contacted the source she said "she had no knowledge or evidence to support Goodwin's claim...that Lichtenstein or "The Infinite Mind" was aware that Goodwin was being paid to give marketing talks on behalf of pharmaceutical companies". In addition, Lichtenstein points out that Goodwin has told the BMJ (formerly the British Medical Journal) that he didn't believe there had been a conflict of interest, and told George Washington University student newspaper that "I frankly do not see these things as a conflict of interest . . . I've always thought that if you have multiple relationships they sort of cancel each other out".

In 2008, Sen. Charles Grassley (IA-R) conducted investigations regarding possible conflicts of interest between various academic psychiatrists and pharmaceutical companies. Goodwin issued a statement that The New York Times article and the follow-up editorial were filled with misstatements of fact and false implications. Grassley said in regard to a 2008 show in which Goodwin took part: "“After listening to a recording of the show, it appeared to me that the real effect of this particular episode was to undercut any criticism that antidepressants might be linked to an increased risk of suicide."

The Infinite Mind program, which was independently produced and distributed, was slated to end its production at the end of 2008 due to a lack of funding. Nevertheless, following the controversy, NPR cancelled the broadcast of reruns of the show on its Sirius Satellite Radio channel.

== Awards ==
- Hofheimer Prize from the American Psychiatric Association
- International Anna-Monika Prize for Research in Depression
- Edward A. Strecker Award
- Falcone Prize from NARSAD
- McAlpin Research Award from the National Mental Health Association
- Distinguished Service Award from NAMI
- Research Award from the American Foundation for Suicide Prevention
- "Psychiatrist of the Year" from Psychiatric Times (first recipient)
- Fawcett Humanitarian Award from the National Depressive and Manic Depressive Association (first recipient)
- A.E. Bennett Award from the Society of Biological Psychiatry
- Psychopharmacology Research Award from the American Psychological Association
- Lifetime Achievement Award from the International Review of Bipolar Disorders
- Public Service Award from the Federation of American Societies for Experimental Biology (FASEB)
- Hope Award from the Depression and Bipolar Support Alliance

== Publications ==
With Kay Redfield Jamison, Goodwin wrote Manic-Depressive Illness, the first psychiatric text to win the "Best Medical Book" award from the Association of American Publishers, which appeared in two editions, 1990 and 2007. He also has authored over 460 academic papers.
