= The Infinite Mind =

US radio program

- Genre: Health and science national, weekly public radio program
- Running time: 60 minutes
- Country of origin: United States
- Language: English
- Syndicates: Lichtenstein Creative Media
- Starring: John Hockenberry, Fred Goodwin, and Peter Kramer
- Created by: Bill Lichtenstein, Lichtenstein Creative Media
- Produced by: June Peoples (Show producer), Marit Haahr; Emily Fisher; Dempsey Rice, Devorah Klahr, Mary Carmichael, Eva Neuberg, Sharon Lerner, Jennifer Chu, Jennifer Ehrlich
- Executive producers: Bill Lichtenstein (1998 - 2004; 2006 - 2008); June Peoples (2003 - 2005)
- Original release: December 20, 1997 (pilot) – November 20, 2008
- Opening theme: The Infinite Mind theme, by Art Labriola
- Ending theme: The Infinite Mind closing theme, by Art Labriola
- Website: http://www.LCMedia.com LCMedia.com
- Podcast: Webstore

The Infinite Mind was a weekly one-hour radio series that aired on National Public Radio (NPR) between 1998 and 2008 in the United States. The show focused on aspects of mental health, neuroscience, and the biology of human behavior and was independently produced and distributed by Lichtenstein Creative Media. At its peak, it had nearly one million listeners weekly, and it received major journalism honors, including a UN Media Award. The program was dropped from NPR's satellite feed after news stories reported that Goodwin had a conflict of interest and was receiving financial compensation from pharmaceutical companies in exchange for consulting and physician education.

== Topics and guests ==
The program was first hosted by Frederick K. Goodwin in 1998 and then by Peter D. Kramer until 2008, with John Hockenberry providing weekly commentary. Goodwin also served as a guest host on various shows during this latter time period.

The program discussed the science and art of the human mind, neuroscience, mental health and the mind/body connection. The series aired one hour programs on topics such as Autism (1998); Hoarding and Clutter (1999), Bullying (2003), Asperger's Syndrome (2004); Alzheimer's (2001); Chronic Fatigue Syndrome (2000); Depression in the Brain (2004); Gambling (2003); Mental Health and Immigrants (2001); Post Traumatic Stress Disorder (2001); Schizoaffective Disorder (2006); and Teen Suicide (1999).

In the two months following the September 11th attacks, The Infinite Mind produced a series of five programs which were the first national programs to examine the mental health impact of the attacks, as well as two live "State of Mind" broadcasts that featured guests Tipper Gore, Rosalynn Carter, Al Franken, Judy Collins, David Straithairn, Surgeon General David Satcher and Marian Wright Edelman, among others. For the broadcasts, producers did primary research with the American Psychological Association into the extent of PTSD and trauma nationally following the September 11th attacks.

The program featured leading experts in the field of neuroscience, mental health and the mind, such as Steven Pinker, Department of Brain and Cognitive Sciences at MIT. In addition to scientific researchers and medical professionals, The Infinite Mind featured celebrity guests including author John Updike; actors Carrie Fisher, Stanley Tucci, Anthony Edwards, Mercedes Ruehl, Margot Kidder and David Straithairn; comedians Richard Lewis and Lewis Black; the Firesign Theater; author William Styron and his wife Rose Styron; baseball batting champ Wade Boggs; former First Lady Rosalynn Carter; documentary filmmaker Ric Burns; television pioneer Norman Lear; business journalist James Cramer; Tipper Gore; Children’s Defense Fund founder Marian Wright Edelman; and live performances and discussions with musicians including Aimee Mann, Jessye Norman, Judy Collins, Suzanne Vega, Janis Ian, Laurie Anderson, Cowboy Junkies, Loudon Wainwright III, Philip Glass, and Emanuel Ax, and the casts of the Broadway hits Avenue Q and Wicked.

For The Infinite Mind, Lichtenstein Creative Media produced the first-ever concert and live radio broadcasts from Second Life in August 2006, with singer Suzanne Vega, author Kurt Vonnegut who appeared in avatar form, Internet proponent Howard Rheingold, and design expert John Maeda.

== Pharmaceutical funding controversy ==
On May 9, 2008, Slate.com posted an article about a segment, "Prozac Nation: Revisited," with four medical experts who said that the link between antidepressants and suicide had been overblown. The show did not disclose the fact that all four experts, including Goodwin, had financial ties to the makers of antidepressants, nor did it disclose that The Infinite Mind had received unrestricted grants from Eli Lilly, the manufacturer of Prozac.

On November 21, 2008, The New York Times reported that the staff of Senator Charles Grassley had "uncovered" the fact that host Fred Goodwin had received "at least $1.3 million from 2000 to 2007 giving marketing lectures for drugmakers, income not mentioned on the program", largely speaking fees for talks to clinicians. Goodwin told The New York Times that The Infinite Mind's executive producer, Bill Lichtenstein, was aware of his activities, while Lichtenstein said he had not been informed. NPR dropped The Infinite Mind from its satellite feed. The show was already slated to end production due to a lack of funding.

Goodwin said that in 2005, recognizing that his involvement with some drug companies might be seen to be in conflict with his role as host, he and Lichtenstein agreed that he would assume the role of guest host, involved only with programs that did not relate to treatment issues. Peter Kramer served as regular host during this time. When Goodwin resumed his role as host in 2008, he was no longer involved in pharmaceutical speaking activities.
