= Hockenberry (talk show) =

American television program

Hockenberry is an American television talk show-style current affairs program that aired on MSNBC in 1998 and 1999. It was hosted by and named after journalist John Hockenberry and aired each weeknight.

Hockenberry was created as a replacement for The Big Show when host Keith Olbermann departed. The show was canceled in July 1999 after six months. The time slot was filled by Hardball with Chris Matthews.
