= John Hockenberry =

American journalist and author (born 1956)

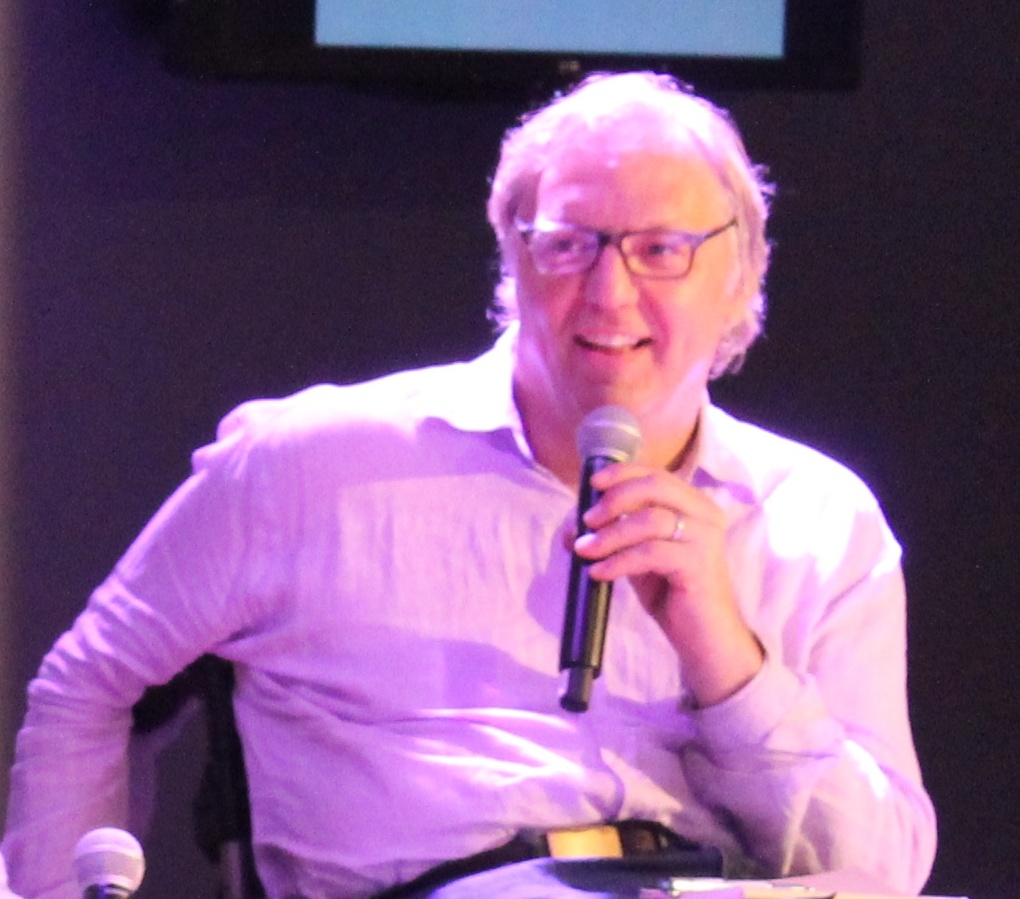
- John Hockenberry in 2015
- Born: John Charles Hockenberry; June 4, 1956 (age 70); Dayton, Ohio, United States
- Education: Studied math at University of Chicago; Studied music at University of Oregon
- Occupations: Radio and television journalist, author
- Years active: 1980–present
- Notable credit(s): HEAT with John Hockenberry, Talk of the Nation, ABC News, Dateline NBC, The Infinite Mind, Edgewise, Hockenberry, The Takeaway
- Spouse(s): Chris Todd (19??–1984); Alison Craiglow (1995–2017)
- Children: 5

John Charles Hockenberry (born June 4, 1956) is an American journalist and author. He has reported from all over the world, on a wide variety of stories in several mediums for more than three decades. He has written dozens of magazine and newspaper articles, a play, and two books, including the bestselling memoir Moving Violations: War Zones, Wheelchairs, and Declarations of Independence, which was a finalist for the National Book Critics Circle Award, and the novel A River Out Of Eden. He has written for The New York Times, The New Yorker, Wired, The Columbia Journalism Review, Metropolis, The Washington Post, and Harper's Magazine.

Hockenberry has appeared as a presenter or moderator at many design and idea conferences around the world including the TED conference, the World Science Festival in New York and in Brisbane, the Mayo Clinic's Transform Symposium, and the Aspen Comedy Festival. He has been a Distinguished Fellow at the MIT Media Lab and serves on the White House Fellows Committee.

He is a prominent figure in the disability rights movement; Hockenberry sustained a spinal cord injury in a car crash at age 19, which left him with paraplegia from the chest down.

In late 2017, several colleagues accused Hockenberry of harassment, unwanted touching and bullying.

== Biography ==
=== Early life ===
Hockenberry was born in Dayton, Ohio, and grew up in Vestal, New York and East Grand Rapids, Michigan. He graduated in 1974 from East Grand Rapids High School in East Grand Rapids, Michigan. In 1976, he was paralyzed while hitchhiking on the Pennsylvania Turnpike. The driver of the car fell asleep and crashed, killing herself. Hockenberry's spinal cord was damaged, and he remains paralyzed without sensation or voluntary movement from the mid-chest down. At the time he was a mathematics major at the University of Chicago, but after his spinal cord injury, he transferred to the University of Oregon in 1980 and studied harpsichord and piano.

=== Journalism career ===
Hockenberry started his career as a volunteer for the National Public Radio affiliate KLCC in Eugene, Oregon. In 1981, he moved to Washington, D.C., where he was a newscaster. From 1989 to 1990 he hosted a two-hour nightly news show called HEAT with John Hockenberry. During his 15 years with NPR, he covered many areas of the world, including an assignment as a Middle East correspondent, reporting on the Persian Gulf War in 1991 and 1992. Beginning in November 1991 he served as the first host of NPR's Talk of the Nation.

After leaving NPR in 1992, Hockenberry also worked for ABC News series Day One from 1993 to 1995, covering the civil war in Somalia and the early days of al-Qaeda in Afghanistan, before joining Dateline NBC as a correspondent in 1996.

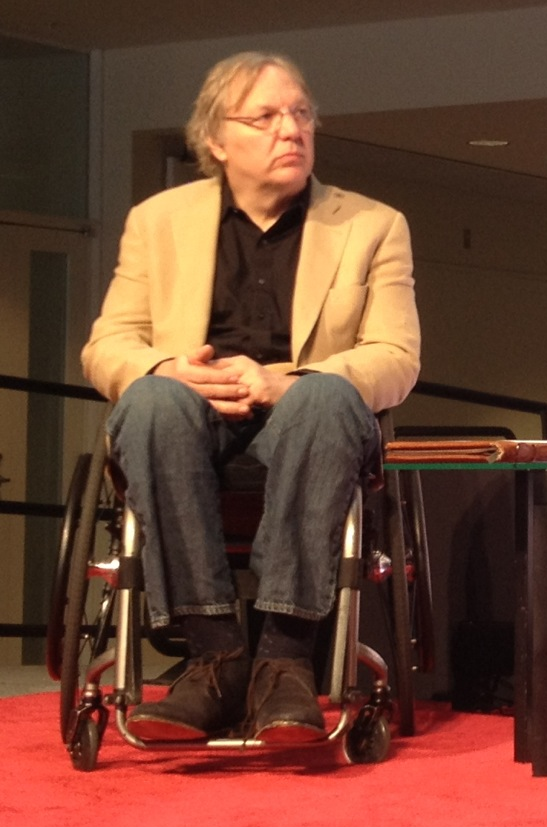
Hockenberry in 2012

External videos
- Booknotes interview with Hockenberry on Moving Violations, July 30, 1995, C-SPAN

In 1995, Hockenberry published his memoir Moving Violations: War Zones, Wheelchairs and Declarations of Independence. In 1996 he appeared off-Broadway in his one-man autobiographical play, Spoke Man. From 1996 to 1997 he hosted Edgewise, an eclectic news magazine program that aired on MSNBC.

In 1999, he hosted Hockenberry, a show which aired on MSNBC for six months. He reported on the Kosovo War in 1999. His weekly radio commentaries aired on the nationally broadcast public radio program The Infinite Mind from 1998 to 2008. He also served as host on The DNA Files for the series airing in 1998, 2001, and 2007. He began developing The Takeaway in 2007 and hosted the show from its 2008 premiere until August 2017.

Hockenberry has narrated several nonfiction projects on healthcare, including Nova series Survivor M.D.: Hearts & Minds, Who Cares: Chronic Illness in America, Remaking American Medicine. He also narrated the eugenics documentary, War Against the Weak.

He has written for The New York Times, The New Yorker, I.D., Wired, The Columbia Journalism Review, Details, and The Washington Post. He published his first novel, A River Out of Eden, in 2002, and he has written about "The Blogs of War" in Wired magazine. In May 2006, he began writing his own blog, "The Blogenberry".

On April 2, 2008, he hosted the premiere of the series Nanotechnology: The Power of Small, discussing the impact of nanotechnology as concerns the general public.

Hockenberry has appeared as presenter and moderator at numerous design and idea conferences around the nation including the Aspen Design Summit, The TED conference, the World Science Festival, and the Aspen Comedy Festival. He also regularly speaks on media, journalism, and disability issues. He was one of the founding inductees to the Spinal Cord Injury Hall of Fame in 2005.

In a New York Magazine exposé, published December 1, 2017, journalist Suki Kim accused Hockenberry of sexually harassing her and other women he had worked with on The Takeaway.

=== Media criticism ===
In 2005 he wrote a scathing review of the Academy Award-winning film Million Dollar Baby called "And the Loser Is..." The review was submitted to a disability website with the title "Million Dollar Bigot" as an exclusive feature. The essay was discussed in news articles globally, and Hockenberry was interviewed about it on FAIR's weekly news show Counterspin. A short documentary film was made, also called Million Dollar Bigot, completed on July 13, 2005, featuring Hockenberry as well as many other disability activists.

Hockenberry wrote in the January 2008 Technology Review magazine that on the Sunday after the September 11 attacks he was pitching stories on the origins of al Qaeda and Islamic fundamentalism. He wrote that then-NBC programming chief Jeff Zucker, who came into a meeting Hockenberry was having with Dateline executive producer David Corvo, said Dateline should instead focus on the firefighters and perhaps ride along with them à la COPS, a Fox reality series. According to Hockenberry, Zucker said "that he had no time for any subtitled interviews with jihadists raging about Palestine." Hockenberry has further claimed that General Electric, NBC's parent company, discouraged him from talking to the Bin Laden family about their estranged family member. Hockenberry says that he asked GE, which does business with the Bin Laden family company, to help him get in contact with them. Instead, a PR executive called Hockenberry's hotel room in Saudi Arabia and read him a statement about how GE didn't see its "valuable business relationship" with the Bin Laden Group as having anything to do with Dateline. In another instance, Hockenberry claimed a story he did about a Weather Underground member would not appear on the Sunday edition of Dateline unless the 1960s family drama American Dreams, which followed Dateline in the schedule at the time, did a show about "protesters or something."

== Personal life ==
Hockenberry is divorced from Alison Craiglow, whom he married in 1995. They have five children, including two sets of twins.

Hockenberry met his first wife, Chris Todd, when he was in a physical rehabilitation facility where she worked as a manager. The couple had no children, and divorced in 1984.

=== Harassment allegations ===
In December 2017, author Suki Kim published an article accusing Hockenberry of harassment, both sexual and otherwise, against both herself and several other co-workers; the article quoted multiple women who said he had done the same to them. The accusations included inappropriate sexual advances towards multiple junior co-workers, as well as shouting at, sabotaging, and publicly humiliating his female co-hosts; one of them, on reporting these incidents to WNYC, was directed towards coaching lessons on handling someone the station considered a "difficult [radio] personality." Shortly afterwards, Adaora Udoji and Farai Chideya released editorials and interviews, respectively, detailing what they said was their own experiences being harassed by Hockenberry. He had left New York Public Radio the previous August, but NYPR president and chief executive Laura Ruth Walker said, "he was not fired for sexual misconduct."

In a lengthy essay titled "Exile" that was published in the October 2018 issue of Harper's, Hockenberry said that "I have never been accused of anything that, in my view, could be construed as criminal or coercive" and characterized his behavior as "improper, failed, and awkward attempts at courtship," a characterization that commentators criticized as dismissive.

== Works ==
- Hockenberry, John (1995). Moving Violations: War Zones, Wheelchairs and Declarations of Independence. Hyperion. ISBN 978-0786881628.
- Hockenberry, John (2002). A River Out of Eden. Anchor, ISBN 978-0385721509.
- Hockenberry, John (October 23, 2012). Frontline episode Climate of Doubt on climate change denial and the climate change controversy
