= Adaora Udoji =

Media innovator

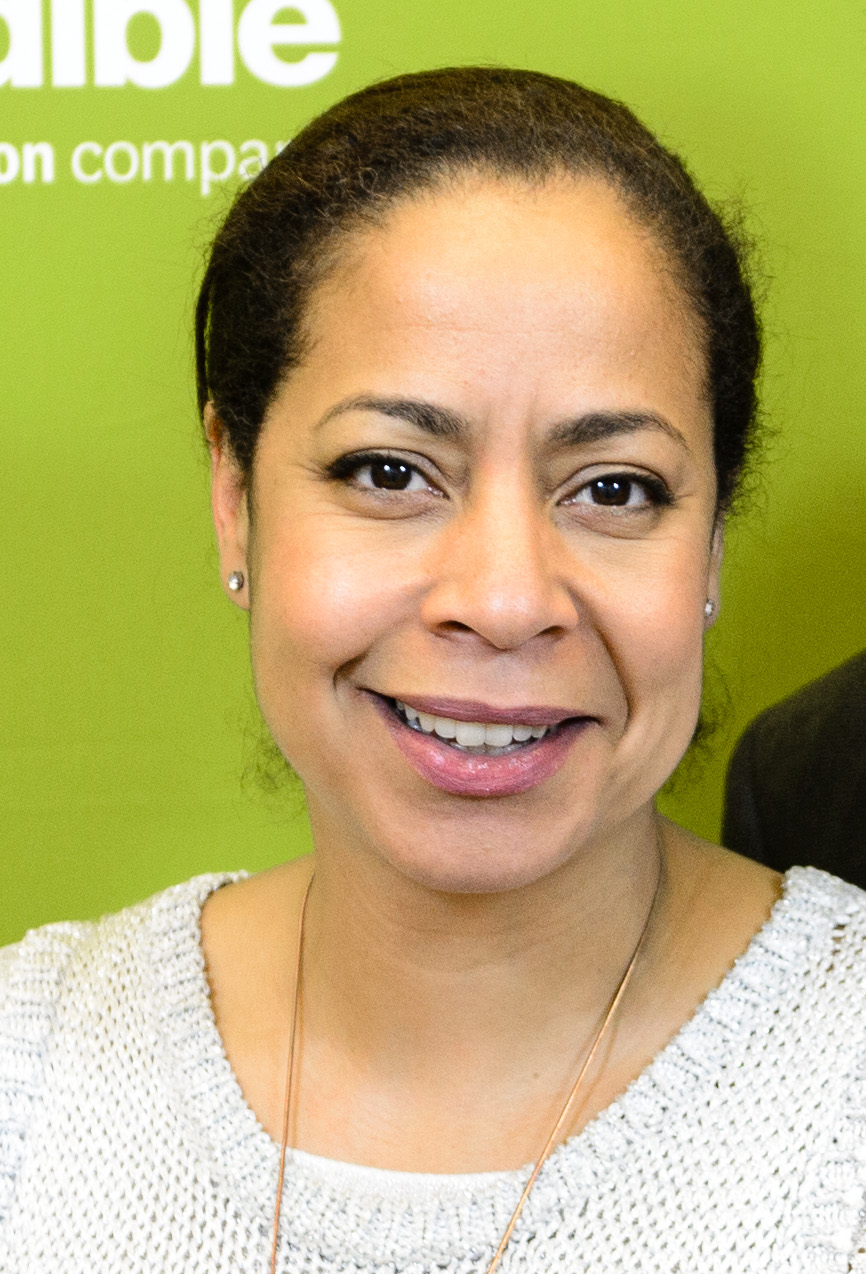
- at the Montclair Film Festival, photo by Neil Grabowsky, 2019
- Born: December 30, 1967 (age 58); United States
- Education: University of Michigan, University of California, Los Angeles, School of Law
- Occupation: Adjunct professor at NYU
- Years active: 1995–present

Adaora Udoji (born December 30, 1967) is an American journalist and producer. She has worked in virtual reality (VR), augmented reality (AR), and artificial intelligence (AI). She is an adviser to VR-AR Association-NYC Chapter, an adjunct professor at NYU's Interactive Telecommunications Program at the Tisch School of the Arts, and an occasional investor.

Previously, she was Chief Storyteller at Rothenberg Ventures and interim president of the media-tech startup News Deeply, which Time magazine calls, "the future of news". She has also served as a board-member of the Montclair Film Festival and the Women's Advisory Board at NBCUniversal. She was also a Woodrow Wilson fellow and subsequently founded the Boshia Group, a network of content and operational strategists, producers and storytellers.

She is among a small group of journalists who have worked in network and cable news, as well as public radio. She is also on the list of 20 Black Angels Worth Knowing For Minority Startups.

== Personal life ==
Udoji is of Nigerian-Irish American descent. Born to father Godfrey Udoji, former chief engineer for the city of Dearborn, Michigan, and mother Mary, former director of Washtenaw County Library in Ann Arbor, Michigan, she has lived on three continents including Africa, Europe and North America, and holds dual American and Irish citizenship.

== Education ==
Udoji earned a bachelor's degree in political science from the University of Michigan. After a stint in the communications office at Michigan's Business School and WUOM, the public radio station, she went on to graduate from UCLA School of Law. During that time she externed for the Honorable Consuelo B. Marshall, United States federal judge, Central District of California, Los Angeles, and clerked for the I.R.S.

== Career ==
Udoji began her journalism career at ABC News in 1995 as an off-air reporter working for Cynthia McFadden covering the O. J. Simpson criminal trial and other legal stories. In 1996 she became an associate producer for ABC News covering the presidential election as a member of the Dole/Kemp press corp, the TWA 800 crash, as well as working on a documentary about death row. The network named her a foreign correspondent in 2000 when she was based in London reporting international stories covering Africa, the Middle East and Europe. Udoji covered the wars in Iraq and Afghanistan, the Israeli-Palestinian conflict, the Vatican, the world economy and sporting events like the British Open and the Tour De France. She also contributed to Good Morning America, World News Weekend and ABC Radio.

At CNN she served as a New York-based correspondent covering stories including the 2004 presidential election, Hurricane Katrina, and the West Virginia Sago Mine disaster for the network's television and radio outlets. On April 25, 2006, she signed with Court TV News as an anchor.

Udoji expanded into public radio as the co-host of The Takeaway with John Hockenberry and Adaora Udoji in 2008, a nationally syndicated co-production by WNYC, The New York Times, BBC, WGBH-Boston and PRI, where she covered her fourth presidential campaign and the election of Barack Obama. After eight months, during which she claimed Hockenberry bullied her, ostensibly because of his frustration with what staff described as her "incompetence", Udori signed an NDA and had the remainder of her contract bought out. Hockenberry retired nine years later, after numerous allegations of abusive behavior came to light.

She has also contributed to Good Morning America, World News Weekend and ABC Radio.

From 2013 to 2014 she was the interim president of News Deeply. She has written extensively on the topics of being a Nigerian woman, beating cancer, and Hurricane Katrina.

She is an angel investor who graduated from the Pipeline Fellowship program.

In November 2021, Adaora joined PBS General Audience Programming team as Vice President of Programming & Operations.

== Awards and recognition ==
Udoji was a member of the CNN news team covering Hurricane Katrina in and around New Orleans, Louisiana, for which the network won a Peabody Award. She was also among the team at ABC News awarded a Cine Golden Eagle award for an ABC News documentary on death row. Udoji was recognized by The National Academy of Television Arts & Sciences for contributions to ABC's coverage of the Afghan War in 2002.

In 2009, Udoji was named one of the 25 Most Influential African Americans by Essence Magazine. In 2007 she was an honoree for the World Diversity Leadership Conference at the United Nations. In 2013, she was a Pipeline Fellow. She has been recognized for her contributions to CNN's 2005 Alfred I. Dupont-Columbia University and Peabody Awards, and by the National Academy of Television Arts & Sciences for reporting at ABC News.

She was invited to participate in the Jones of New York Little Book Campaign. Udoji is a recipient of the Forty Under Forty Achievement Award by the Network Journal.

Having worked across the creative and business sides of television, radio, internet, corporate and venture capital, Udoji is often quoted in the press. In a 2017 article for Immerse magazine titled "Who is VR for?", the senior consultant at the Tribeca Film Institute, Ingrid Kopp, described Adaora Udoji as "advisor, teacher and all-round-badass". In another Buzzfeed article from 2017, she talks about "What It's Actually Like to be a Woman in VR".

She has also been a featured presenter for MIT Solve, Producers Guild of America-East, Games for Change Festival, NYC Media Lab, Microsoft, Panasonic, BinderCon, Versions, ARInAction, Girls Who Code, the StartUp Institute NYC, the New York Women Social Entrepreneurs, ACLU, New York Women in Film and Television, the Feminist Press, the Council of Urban Professionals, Internet Week NYC, SXSW and the New York Women in Communications Foundation.
