= Plumbline (disambiguation) =

A plumbline is a string with a lead (Latin plumbum) weight (or plumb bob), used to provide a vertical reference line.

It may also refer to:

- The Plumbline, a joke newspaper produced by the McMaster Engineering Society
- Plumb Line, a film by Carolee Schneemann
- the vertical direction, a line orthogonal to the geoid, as used in geodesy
