= Meat Joy =

1964 performance by Carolee Schneemann

Meat Joy is a 1964 performance piece created by American artist Carolee Schneemann. It was performed in Paris, London, and New York City.

== Description ==
Meat Joy involves nine participants with designated roles: a central man and central woman, two lateral men and two lateral women, an independent man and independent woman, and a serving man. They stage a series of interactions involving painting each other's bodies; rubbing raw chicken, fish, and sausage onto each other; and arranging their bodies in different configurations. It lasts sixty to eighty minutes, depending on how long its improvised sections take.

During the performance, a sound collage is played which combines excerpts of contemporary popular music and recordings of vendors at a fish market. Songs appearing in the soundtrack include Dusty Springfield's "Wishin' and Hopin'", Elvis Presley's "Blue Suede Shoes", Lesley Gore's "That's the Way Boys Are", Little Richard's "Tutti Frutti", the Newbeats' "Bread and Butter", and the Supremes' "Baby Love".

== Development ==
Meat Joy originated from journal entries describing Schneemann's dreams, starting in 1960. Icelandic artist Erró, who had photographed Schneemann's 1963 performance Eye Body, connected her to Jean-Jacques Lebel's Festival of Free Expression.

She assembled the original cast from artists associated with Lebel and strangers she met in local cafés. Schneemann cast people based on their physical qualities and explicitly preferred people who had no formal training. This practice was inspired by Antonin Artaud and carried forward in future pieces.

Schneemann developed choreography that made room for participants to respond spontaneously to the events, and the cast spent two weeks rehearsing contact improvisations. In an effort to capture their authentic reactions to the introduction of the paint and meat, she had them practice without those elements.

== Performance history ==
Meat Joy was first performed in May 1964, as part of the Festival of Free Expression in Paris. The performance took place in the American Center, which offered some amount of protection against the censorship of nudity in live performance. The cast consisted of Schneemann, Daniel Pommereulle, Danielle Auffrey, Romain Denis, Annina Nosei, Claude Richard, Rita Renoir, Jacques Seiler, and Claudia Hutchins. One of the performances was temporarily interrupted by an angry audience member who dragged Schneemann and began to strangle her, before being stopped by two other audience members.

Meat Joy was later performed at Denison Hall in London in June 1964, when producer Michael White organized a smaller version of the festival. However, police raided the event, chasing the performers off the stage.

The production was entirely recast in New York, with the exception of Schneemann reprising her role as the central woman. The cast was Schneemann, James Tenney, Dorothea Rockburne, Tom O'Donnell, Irina Posner, Robert D. Cohen, Sandra Chew, Stanley Gochenauer, and Ann Wilson. The performance took place in November 1964 at the Judson Memorial Church in New York City. It was restaged at a local television studio where the performance could be filmed by Pierre Dominique Gaisseau.

== Reception ==
The response to Meat Joy in France was mixed. Some critics were unreceptive, viewing its treatment of sexuality as unprovocative and unlikely to engage viewers politically. In the United States, dance critic Jill Johnston gave a mixed review in The Village Voice, asking, "Why bother with relative nudity if you can make something happen with paper?" Dancer and filmmaker Yvonne Rainer considered the performance "brainless". The Village Voice's theatre critic Michael Townsend Smith called it "richly inventive and much more vital than other theatre work being now being done in this vicinity." Michael Benedikt characterized Meat Joy as an extension of gestural abstraction, in which "Schneemann's contribution…was to fulfill these gestures with an element that has seldom been treated as anything but abstract in both painting and theatre: the human form."

== Legacy ==
Performance artist Ragnar Kjartansson paid homage to Meat Joy in his 2013 performance piece Variation on Meat Joy. In it, a group of performers, dressed in Rococo fashion, dine on steak as the sound of their eating is amplified.

In advance of the work's fiftieth anniversary, choreographer Mette Ingvartsen approached Schneemann about restaging Meat Joy, but Schneemann responded that too many of the original participants were no longer alive or had "lost flexibility, mobility, and the sort of ecstatic sensuality that is best communicated by young bodies". Ingvartsen ultimately reenacted Meat Joy as part of her performance 69 Positions, which examines the role of sexuality in performance work.

== Bibliography ==
- Archias, Elise (2016). The Concrete Body. Yale University Press. ISBN 978-0-300-21797-1.
- Benedikt, Michael, ed. (1967). Theatre Experiment: An Anthology of American Plays. Doubleday & Company.
- Breitwieser, Sabine, ed. (2015). Kinetic Painting. Prestel Publishing. ISBN 978-3-7913-5508-5.
- Hoberman, J. (2025). Everything Is Now: The 1960s New York Avant-Garde—Primal Happenings, Underground Movies, Radical Pop. Verso Books. ISBN 978-1-80429-086-6.
- Serra, M. M.; Ramey, Kathryn (2007). "Eye/Body: The Cinematic Paintings of Carolee Schneemann". In Blaetz, Robin (ed.). Women's Experimental Cinema: Critical Frameworks. Duke University Press. ISBN 978-0-8223-4023-2.
