= Fuses (film) =

- Directed by: Carolee Schneemann
- Starring: Carolee Schneemann; James Tenney
- Edited by: Carolee Schneemann
- Release date: 1967
- Running time: 29 minutes
- Country: United States
- Language: Silent

Fuses is a 1967 American experimental short film by Carolee Schneemann. It shows Schneemann's relationship with James Tenney, including their sexual interactions.

== Production ==
Schneemann made Fuses from 1964 to 1967, using a Bolex 16 mm camera she had borrowed. She positioned the camera to capture some scenes, and others involved her and Tenney taking turns operating the camera. Stan Vanderbeek shot one segment of Schneemann and Tenney kissing.

As the film was being shot, Schneemann continued to manipulate the original footage and reassemble it. She experimented with many techniques to alter the film—applying dyes and acids, baking it in an oven, cutting it up before taping it to blank leader, and hanging it outside during storms to see if it would be struck by lightning. The collaging of material created technical challenges, and at first, the film laboratory could not run Fuses through their printer. While editing the film, Schneemann drew on her experience with painting and conceived of the process "the way I would work on a canvas…working with film as one extended frame in time."

Schneemann made Fuses as a response to works by filmmaker Stan Brakhage. His Window Water Baby Moving (1959) showed his wife Jane giving birth to the couple's first child. Schneemann believed that Jane's role in the creation of the film was underrecognized. Schneemann and Tenney had appeared in Brakhage's Loving (1957). She felt that although Brakhage's desire to capture "the erotic sensitivity and vitality that was between Jim and me", he had "failed to capture our central eroticism, and I wanted to set that right."

== Release ==
Schneemann used Fuses and Viet Flakes in Round House, a happening presented in London during the 1967 Dialectics of Liberation Congress. Conference organizers' concerns about legal vulnerability prompted her to consider replacing Fuses with slide projection. Programs for the event include a disclaimer explaining that the film could not be shown due to British obscenity laws, but Schneemann ultimately included it in the performance. Fuses was screened at the 1968 Cannes Film Festival as part of a jury selection. In response to the film, men damaged the theatre's seats using razor blades.

In 1985, police in El Paso arrested a projectionist for screening the film and seized a print of Fuses. It was to be included in a "Sexuality in American Films" program at the 1989 Moscow International Film Festival, organized with the San Francisco International Film Festival. However, after the opening night, it was pulled from subsequent programs until, at the insistence of American organizers, it was reinstated without an announcement.

Schneemann grouped Fuses with her later films Plumb Line and Kitch's Last Meal to form her Autobiographical Trilogy. Although the three works were conceived independently, she began to consider them part of a larger work after Anthony McCall and Bruce McPherson pointed out their thematic similarities.

== Bibliography ==
- Harding, James M. (2010). Cutting Performances: Collage Events, Feminist Artists, and the American Avant-Garde. University of Michigan Press. ISBN 978-0-472-11718-5.
- MacDonald, Scott (1988). A Critical Cinema: Interviews with Independent Filmmakers. University of California Press. ISBN 978-0-520-05800-2.
- Osterweil, Ara (2015). "Carolee Schneemann's Cinema: Worlding the Frame". In Breitwieser, Sabine (ed.). Kinetic Painting. Prestel Publishing. ISBN 978-3-7913-5508-5.
- Rahmani, Aviva (2000). "A Conversation on Censorship with Carolee Schneemann". In Schor, Mira; Bee, Susan (eds.). M/E/A/N/I/N/G: An Anthology of Artists' Writings, Theory, and Criticism. Duke University Press. ISBN 978-0-8223-2534-5.
- Rich, B. Ruby (1998). Chick Flicks. Duke University Press. ISBN 978-0-8223-2106-4.
- Serra, M. M.; Ramey, Kathryn (2007). "Eye/Body: The Cinematic Paintings of Carolee Schneemann". In Blaetz, Robin (ed.). Women's Experimental Cinema: Critical Frameworks. Duke University Press. ISBN 978-0-8223-4023-2.
- Youngblood, Gene (1970). Expanded Cinema. E. P. Dutton. ISBN 978-0-525-10152-9.
