= 2011 ADAC Procar Series =

Motor racing competition in Germany

Seasons
- ← 2010 2012 →

The 2011 ADAC Procar Series season was the seventeenth season of the ADAC Procar Series, the German championship for Super 2000 touring cars. The season consisted of eight separate race weekends with two races each, spread over seven different tracks.

== Teams and drivers ==
| Team | Car | No. | Drivers | Rounds |
Division 1
| (Germany) Liqui Moly Team Engstler | BMW 320si E90 | 2 | (Germany) Johannes Leidinger | All |
| (Germany) Yaco Racing | Toyota Auris S2000 | 7 | (Germany) Charlie Geipel | 8 |
| (Germany) Yaco Racing | Toyota Auris S2000 | 8 | (Switzerland) Lorenz Frey | 1–2, 4–5 |
| (Germany) Yaco Racing | Toyota Auris S2000 | 9 | (Russia) Michail Stepanov | All |
| (Switzerland) Rikli Motorsport | Mercedes-Benz C200 | 10 | (Switzerland) Michel Zemp | 4 |
| (Switzerland) Rikli Motorsport | Honda Accord Euro R | 11 | (Switzerland) Christian Fischer | All |
| (Switzerland) Rikli Motorsport | Honda Civic FD | 12 | (Switzerland) Peter Rikli | All |
| (Switzerland) Rikli Motorsport | BMW 320i E46 | 16 | (Switzerland) Markus Huggler | 8 |
| (Germany) Thate Motorsport | BMW 320si E90 | 14 | (Germany) Jens Guido Weimann | All |
| (Denmark) Polar Seafood Racing | Renault Clio | 15 | (Denmark) Thomas Fjordbach | 1 |
| (Germany) K&K Motorsport | Audi A4 Super 2000 | 21 | (Germany) Andreas Kast | 2–6 |
| (Germany) Racing Team Kaul | Opel Astra H GTC | 22 | (Germany) Matthias Kaul | 2–5 |
Division 2
| (Germany) ETH Tuning | Peugeot 207 | 31 | (Germany) Guido Thierfelder | All |
| (Germany) ETH Tuning | Peugeot 207 | 32 | (Germany) Oliver Kerlé | 4 |
| (Germany) ATM Speed Ladies | Ford Fiesta | 33 | (Germany) Ulrike Krafft | All |
| (Germany) Roscher Racing | Ford Fiesta | 34 | (Germany) Rafael Roscher | 8 |
| (Germany) WM Sporting | Ford Fiesta | 35 | (Germany) Peter Ruwolt | 4 |
| (Germany) NK Racing | Ford Fiesta | 39 | (Germany) Ronny Reinsberger | 2, 4, 7–8 |
| (Germany) Rhino's Leipert Motorsport | Ford Fiesta | 40 | (Germany) Martin Löser | 6 |
| (Germany) Rhino's Leipert Motorsport | Ford Fiesta | 41 | (Germany) Nils Mierschke | All |
| (Germany) Glatzel Racing | Ford Fiesta | 42 | (Germany) Ralf Glatzel | All |
| (Germany) Glatzel Racing | Ford Fiesta | 43 | (Germany) Lucas Buhk | 1–2, 5–8 |
| (Germany) Glatzel Racing | Ford Fiesta | 44 | (Germany) Saskia Müller | 1–5 |
| (Germany) Glatzel Racing | Ford Fiesta | 77 | (Switzerland) Sandra Sutter | 6–7 |
| (Croatia) Gena Autosport | Ford Fiesta | 46 | (Germany) Kevin Krammes | All |
| (Croatia) Gena Autosport | Ford Fiesta | 47 | (Germany) Erwin Lukas | 3, 7 |
| (Croatia) Gena Autosport | Ford Fiesta | 66 | (Germany) Julia Trampert | 6, 8 |
| (Germany) Lafia Motorsport | Citroën C2 VTS | 48 | (Germany) Niklas Mackschin | 1, 3, 6 |
| (Germany) Lafia Motorsport | Citroën C2 VTS | 49 | (Germany) Felix Janning | 4, 7 |
| (Germany) ATM Racing | Ford Fiesta | 52 | (Germany) Klaus Bingler | 2–3, 8 |
| (Germany) ATM Racing | Ford Fiesta | 55 | (Germany) Jens Löhnig | 4, 6 |

== Race calendar and results ==
| Round | | Circuit | Date | Pole position | Fastest lap | Winning driver | Winning team |
|---|---|---|---|---|---|---|---|
| 1 | R1 | (Germany) Motorsport Arena Oschersleben | 25 April | (Germany) Johannes Leidinger | (Germany) Johannes Leidinger | (Germany) Johannes Leidinger | (Germany) Liqui Moly Team Engstler |
| 1 | R2 | (Germany) Motorsport Arena Oschersleben | 25 April | | (Germany) Johannes Leidinger | (Germany) Johannes Leidinger | (Germany) Liqui Moly Team Engstler |
| 2 | R1 | (Germany) Sachsenring | 14 May | (Switzerland) Peter Rikli | (Switzerland) Peter Rikli | (Germany) Jens Guido Weimann | (Germany) Thate Motorsport |
| 2 | R2 | (Germany) Sachsenring | 15 May | | (Germany) Johannes Leidinger | (Switzerland) Peter Rikli | (Switzerland) Rikli Motorsport |
| 3 | R1 | (Belgium) Circuit Zolder | 12 June | (Germany) Johannes Leidinger | (Germany) Johannes Leidinger | (Germany) Jens Guido Weimann | (Germany) Thate Motorsport |
| 3 | R2 | (Belgium) Circuit Zolder | 12 June | | (Germany) Johannes Leidinger | (Germany) Johannes Leidinger | (Germany) Liqui Moly Team Engstler |
| 4 | R1 | (Germany) Motorsport Arena Oschersleben | 31 July | (Germany) Johannes Leidinger | (Germany) Johannes Leidinger | (Germany) Johannes Leidinger | (Germany) Liqui Moly Team Engstler |
| 4 | R2 | (Germany) Motorsport Arena Oschersleben | 31 July | | (Germany) Matthias Kaul | (Switzerland) Peter Rikli | (Switzerland) Rikli Motorsport |
| 5 | R1 | (Austria) Red Bull Ring | 14 August | (Germany) Jens Guido Weimann | (Germany) Johannes Leidinger | (Germany) Johannes Leidinger | (Germany) Liqui Moly Team Engstler |
| 5 | R2 | (Austria) Red Bull Ring | 14 August | | (Germany) Jens Guido Weimann | (Germany) Johannes Leidinger | (Germany) Liqui Moly Team Engstler |
| 6 | R1 | (Germany) Lausitzring | 4 September | (Germany) Johannes Leidinger | (Germany) Jens Guido Weimann | (Germany) Jens Guido Weimann | (Germany) Thate Motorsport |
| 6 | R2 | (Germany) Lausitzring | 4 September | | (Germany) Jens Guido Weimann | (Germany) Johannes Leidinger | (Germany) Liqui Moly Team Engstler |
| 7 | R1 | (Netherlands) TT Circuit Assen | 18 September | (Germany) Johannes Leidinger | (Germany) Jens Guido Weimann | (Switzerland) Peter Rikli | (Switzerland) Rikli Motorsport |
| 7 | R2 | (Netherlands) TT Circuit Assen | 18 September | | (Germany) Jens Guido Weimann | (Germany) Johannes Leidinger | (Germany) Liqui Moly Team Engstler |
| 8 | R1 | (Germany) Hockenheimring | 2 October | (Germany) Johannes Leidinger | (Germany) Johannes Leidinger | (Germany) Jens Guido Weimann | (Germany) Thate Motorsport |
| 8 | R2 | (Germany) Hockenheimring | 2 October | | (Germany) Johannes Leidinger | (Germany) Jens Guido Weimann | (Germany) Thate Motorsport |

== Championship standings ==
=== Drivers' Championship ===
| Pos | Driver | OSC (Germany) | | SAC (Germany) | | ZOL (Belgium) | | OSC (Germany) | | RBR (Austria) | | LAU (Germany) | | ASS (Netherlands) | | HOC (Germany) | | Points |
Division 1
| 1 | (Germany) Johannes Leidinger | **1** | 1 | 2 | 2 | **2** | 1 | **1** | 3 | 1 | 1 | **2** | 1 | **2** | 1 | **6** | 11 | 134 |
| 2 | (Germany) Jens Guido Weimann | Ret | NC | 1 | 3 | 1 | 2 | 3 | 2 | **2** | 2 | 1 | 4 | 4 | 2 | 1 | 1 | 112 |
| 3 | (Switzerland) Peter Rikli | 3 | 5 | **4** | 1 | 6 | Ret | 2 | 1 | 3 | Ret | 5 | 5 | 1 | 3 | 2 | 2 | 92 |
| 4 | (Switzerland) Christian Fischer | 2 | 4 | 3 | 4 | 3 | Ret | 8 | 5 | 4 | 4 | 4 | 2 | 3 | 4 | 5 | Ret | 73 |
| 5 | (Russia) Michail Stepanov | 4 | 2 | 5 | 5 | 4 | 3 | 6 | DNS | 5 | 3 | 6 | 3 | 5 | DNS | Ret | DNS | 58 |
| 6 | (Germany) Andreas Kast | | | DNS | DNS | 5 | 4 | Ret | DNS | 13 | DNS | 3 | DNS | | | | | 18 |
| 7 | (Switzerland) Lorenz Frey | 5 | 3 | DNS | DNS | | | 4 | 7 | Ret | DNS | | | | | | | 17 |
| 8 | (Switzerland) Markus Huggler | | | | | | | | | | | | | | | 4 | 3 | 11 |
| 9 | (Germany) Matthias Kaul | | | Ret | DNS | 7 | DNS | 7 | 4 | Ret | DNS | | | | | | | 9 |
| 10 | (Switzerland) Michel Zemp | | | | | | | 5 | 6 | | | | | | | | | 7 |
| 11 | (Germany) Charlie Geipel | | | | | | | | | | | | | | | 3 | Ret | 6 |
| 12 | (Denmark) Thomas Fjordbach | 6 | 6 | | | | | | | | | | | | | | | 6 |
Division 2
| 1 | (Germany) Nils Mierschke | 7 | 7 | **7** | 8 | 9 | 6 | 11 | Ret | **6** | 5 | **7** | 8 | 7 | 5 | 8 | 5 | 126 |
| 2 | (Germany) Guido Thierfelder | **9** | 10 | 6 | 6 | **8** | 5 | **9** | 11 | 7 | 6 | 14 | DSQ | 6 | 6 | **7** | 4 | 121 |
| 3 | (Germany) Ralf Glatzel | 8 | Ret | Ret | 14 | 10 | 7 | 12 | 10 | 9 | 8 | 9 | 6 | **9** | 8 | 9 | DNS | 73 |
| 4 | (Germany) Kevin Krammes | 10 | 9 | 9 | 9 | Ret | DNS | 10 | 9 | 8 | 7 | 10 | 7 | 10 | 11 | Ret | Ret | 68 |
| 5 | (Germany) Ulrike Krafft | 12 | 8 | 8 | 7 | Ret | DNS | NC | Ret | 12 | Ret | 8 | 12 | Ret | 7 | 12 | 6 | 52 |
| 6 | (Germany) Lucas Buhk | 11 | 11 | Ret | 12 | | | | | 11 | 9 | 13 | 9 | 8 | 10 | 10 | Ret | 38 |
| 7 | (Germany) Ronny Reinsberger | | | 10 | 11 | | | 14 | 13 | | | | | 11 | 9 | 11 | 7 | 29 |
| 8 | (Germany) Saskia Müller | Ret | DNS | 12 | 13 | 12 | 9 | 15 | 12 | 10 | 10 | | | | | | | 24 |
| 9 | (Germany) Jens Löhnig | | | | | | | 13 | 8 | | | 11 | Ret | | | | | 18 |
| 10 | (Germany) Klaus Bingler | | | 11 | 10 | Ret | DNS | | | | | | | | | 13 | 9 | 12 |
| 11 | (Germany) Niklas Mackschin | 13 | 12 | | | 13 | 10 | | | | | Ret | Ret | | | | | 11 |
| 12 | (Germany) Erwin Lukas | | | | | 11 | 8 | | | | | | | Ret | 13 | | | 10 |
| 13 | (Germany) Martin Löser | | | | | | | | | | | 12 | 10 | | | | | 7 |
| 14 | (Germany) Julia Trampert | | | | | | | | | | | 16 | 13 | | | 15 | 8 | 5 |
| 15 | (Switzerland) Sandra Sutter | | | | | | | | | | | 15 | 11 | 13 | 12 | | | 5 |
| 16 | (Germany) Rafael Roscher | | | | | | | | | | | | | | | 14 | 10 | 3 |
| 17 | (Germany) Felix Janning | | | | | | | 16 | Ret | | | | | 12 | 14 | | | 3 |
| 18 | (Germany) Peter Ruwolt | | | | | | | 17 | 14 | | | | | | | | | 2 |
| | (Germany) Oliver Kerlé | | | | | | | DNS | DNS | | | | | | | | | 0 |
| Pos | Driver | OSC (Germany) | | SAC (Germany) | | ZOL (Belgium) | | OSC (Germany) | | RBR (Austria) | | LAU (Germany) | | ASS (Netherlands) | | HOC (Germany) | | Points |

| Colour | Result |
|---|---|
| Gold | Winner |
| Silver | Second place |
| Bronze | Third place |
| Green | Points classification |
| Blue | Non-points classification |
| Blue | Non-classified finish (NC) |
| Purple | Retired, not classified (Ret) |
| Red | Did not qualify (DNQ) |
| Red | Did not pre-qualify (DNPQ) |
| Black | Disqualified (DSQ) |
| White | Did not start (DNS) |
| White | Withdrew (WD) |
| White | Race cancelled (C) |
| Blank | Did not practice (DNP) |
| Blank | Did not arrive (DNA) |
| Blank | Excluded (EX) |

**Bold** – Pole
Italics – Fastest lap

=== Teams' Championship ===
| Pos | Team | OSC (Germany) | | SAC (Germany) | | ZOL (Belgium) | | OSC (Germany) | | RBR (Austria) | | LAU (Germany) | | ASS (Netherlands) | | HOC (Germany) | | Points |
Division 1
| 1 | (Germany) Liqui Moly Team Engstler | 1 | 1 | 2 | 2 | 2 | 1 | 1 | 3 | 1 | 1 | 2 | 1 | 2 | 1 | 6 | 11 | 134 |
| 2 | (Germany) Thate Motorsport | Ret | NC | 1 | 3 | 1 | 2 | 3 | 2 | 2 | 2 | 1 | 4 | 4 | 2 | 1 | 1 | 112 |
| 3 | (Switzerland) Rikli Motorsport 1 | 2 | 4 | 3 | 1 | 3 | Ret | 2 | 1 | 3 | 4 | 4 | 2 | 1 | 3 | 2 | 2 | 109 |
| 4 | (Germany) Yaco Racing 1 | 4 | 2 | 5 | 5 | 4 | 3 | 4 | 7 | 5 | 3 | 6 | 3 | 5 | DNS | Ret | DNS | 62 |
| 5 | (Switzerland) Rikli Motorsport 2 | | | | | | | 5 | 6 | | | | | | | 4 | 3 | 18 |
| 6 | (Germany) K&K Motorsport | | | DNS | DNS | 5 | 4 | Ret | DNS | 13 | DNS | 3 | DNS | | | | | 18 |
| 7 | (Germany) Racing Team Kaul | | | Ret | DNS | 7 | DNS | 7 | 4 | Ret | DNS | | | | | | | 9 |
| 8 | (Germany) Yaco Racing 2 | | | | | | | | | | | | | | | 3 | Ret | 6 |
| 9 | (Denmark) Polar Seafood Racing | 6 | 6 | | | | | | | | | | | | | | | 6 |
Division 2
| 1 | (Germany) Leipert Motorsport | 7 | 7 | 7 | 8 | 9 | 6 | 11 | Ret | 6 | 5 | 7 | 8 | 7 | 5 | 8 | 5 | 126 |
| 2 | (Germany) ETH Tuning | 9 | 10 | 6 | 6 | 8 | 5 | 9 | 11 | 7 | 6 | 14 | DSQ | 6 | 6 | 7 | 4 | 121 |
| 3 | (Croatia) Gena Autosport 1 | 10 | 9 | 9 | 9 | 11 | 8 | 10 | 9 | 8 | 7 | 10 | 7 | 10 | 11 | Ret | Ret | 78 |
| 4 | (Germany) Glatzel Racing 1 | 8 | Ret | 12 | 13 | 10 | 7 | 12 | 10 | 9 | 8 | 9 | 6 | 9 | 8 | 9 | DNS | 76 |
| 5 | (Germany) ATM Speed Ladies Team (Germany) ATM Racing 1 | 12 | 8 | 8 | 7 | Ret | DNS | NC | Ret | 12 | Ret | 8 | 12 | Ret | 7 | 12 | 6 | 52 |
| 6 | (Germany) Glatzel Racing 2 | 11 | 11 | Ret | 12 | | | | | 11 | 9 | 13 | 9 | 8 | 10 | 10 | Ret | 38 |
| 7 | (Germany) NK Racing Team | | | 10 | 11 | | | 14 | 13 | | | | | 11 | 9 | 11 | 7 | 29 |
| 8 | (Germany) ATM Racing 2 | | | | | | | 13 | 8 | | | 11 | Ret | | | | | 18 |
| 9 | (Germany) Lafia Motorsport | 13 | 12 | | | 13 | 10 | 16 | Ret | | | Ret | Ret | 12 | 14 | | | 14 |
| 10 | (Croatia) Gena Autosport 2 | | | | | | | | | | | 16 | 13 | | | 15 | 8 | 5 |
| 11 | (Germany) Roscher Racing | | | | | | | | | | | | | | | 14 | 10 | 3 |
| 12 | (Germany) WM Sporting | | | | | | | 17 | 14 | | | | | | | | | 2 |
| Pos | Team | OSC (Germany) | | SAC (Germany) | | ZOL (Belgium) | | OSC (Germany) | | RBR (Austria) | | LAU (Germany) | | ASS (Netherlands) | | HOC (Germany) | | Points |

| Colour | Result |
|---|---|
| Gold | Winner |
| Silver | Second place |
| Bronze | Third place |
| Green | Points classification |
| Blue | Non-points classification |
| Blue | Non-classified finish (NC) |
| Purple | Retired, not classified (Ret) |
| Red | Did not qualify (DNQ) |
| Red | Did not pre-qualify (DNPQ) |
| Black | Disqualified (DSQ) |
| White | Did not start (DNS) |
| White | Withdrew (WD) |
| White | Race cancelled (C) |
| Blank | Did not practice (DNP) |
| Blank | Did not arrive (DNA) |
| Blank | Excluded (EX) |

| Position | 1st | 2nd | 3rd | 4th | 5th | 6th | 7th | 8th |
| Points | 10 | 8 | 6 | 5 | 4 | 3 | 2 | 1 |
