= 2014 ADAC Procar Series =

Motor racing competition in Germany

The 2014 ADAC Procar Series season was the twentieth season of the ADAC Procar Series, the German championship for Super 2000 touring cars. For this season two new divisions was introduced Super 1600 Turbo & Mini Challenge. The season consisted of eight separate race weekends with two races each, spread over seven different tracks.

== Teams and drivers ==
Team	Car	No.	Drivers	Rounds
Division 1
(Germany) Thate Motorsport	BMW 320si E90	1	(Germany) Jens Guido Weimann	5
(Russia) A.M.G. Motorsport	BMW 320si E90	3	(Russia) Mikhail Stepanov	1
(Russia) A.M.G. Motorsport	BMW 320si E90	4	(Russia) Mikhail Grachev	1
(Germany) LB-Racing	Ford Fiesta ST	7	(Germany) Johannes Leidinger	2–8
(Germany) Wolf Racing	Ford Fiesta ST	8	(Germany) Heiko Hammel	All
(Switzerland) Huggler Motorsport	BMW 320i E46	9	(Switzerland) Markus Huggler	4–5
(Germany) Yaco Racing	Toyota Auris S2000	10	(Germany) Charlie Geipel	6, 8
(Switzerland) Rikli Motorsport	Honda Civic FD	11	(Switzerland) Peter Rikli	7
(Switzerland) Rikli Motorsport	Honda Civic FD	12	(Italy) Dario Pergolini	7
(Germany) Schirra Motoring	Mini John Cooper Works	13	(Germany) Joachim Schirra	6–7
(Germany) ETH Tuning	Peugeot 207 Turbo	15	(Germany) Guido Thierfelder	2, 7
(Germany) ETH Tuning	Peugeot 207 Turbo	16	(Germany) Arno Dahm	1, 5–6
(Germany) Caisley Team Dombek (Germany) Besapalast Team Dombek	Mini John Cooper Works	17	(Germany) Reinhard Nehls	All
(Germany) Caisley Team Dombek (Germany) Besapalast Team Dombek	Mini John Cooper Works	18	(Croatia) Franjo Kovac	All
Division 2
(Germany) ETH Tuning	Citroën Saxo VTS	60	(Germany) Andreas Rinke	All
(Germany) ETH Tuning	Peugeot 207 Sport	61	(Germany) Guido Thierfelder	1
(Germany) ETH Tuning	Peugeot 207 Sport	62	(Germany) Alexander Rambow	All
(Germany) ETH Tuning	Peugeot 207 Sport	64	(Germany) Norbert Heinz	6
(Germany) ETH Tuning	Peugeot 207 Sport	67	(Germany) Arno Dahm	2
(Germany) ETH Tuning	Peugeot 207 Sport	68	(Germany) Michael Krings	3
(Germany) Kowalski Racing	Ford Fiesta ST	63	(Germany) Michael Kowalski	1, 5, 8
(Germany) Lafia Motorsport	Citroën C2 VTS	65	(Germany) Olaf Müller	1, 5
(Luxembourg) Team LuxMotor	Ford Fiesta 1.6 16V	35	(Luxembourg) Gilles Bruckner	7
(Germany) Glatzel Racing	Ford Fiesta ST	77	(Denmark) Thomas Krebs	1–4
(Germany) Glatzel Racing	Ford Fiesta ST	81	(Germany) Steffen Schwan	6, 8
(Germany) Glatzel Racing	Ford Fiesta ST	84	(Belarus) Yury Krauchuk	1–3, 6, 7
(Germany) Glatzel Racing	Ford Fiesta 1.6 16V	82	(Germany) Ronny Reinsberger	1, 3, 5–6, 8
(Germany) Glatzel Racing	Ford Fiesta 1.6 16V	83	(Germany) Ralf Glatzel	All
(Germany) Mierschke Motorsport	Ford Fiesta 1.6 16V	89	(Germany) Nils Mierschke	4, 8
Division 3
(Germany) Heide Motorsport	Mini John Cooper Works	31	(Germany) Michael Heide	1–3, 5–8
(Germany) Heide Motorsport	Mini John Cooper Works	32	(Germany) Ingo Kampmann	7, 8
(Germany) Heide Motorsport	Mini John Cooper Works	38	(Germany) Lothar Sausemuth	7
(Germany) IMC Motorsport	Mini John Cooper Works	33	(Germany) Victoria Froß	All
(Germany) IMC Motorsport	Mini John Cooper Works	34	(Germany) Lisa Christin Brunner	1–5
(Germany) H & R Team Dombek (Germany) Besapalast Team Dombek	Mini John Cooper Works	37	(Germany) Kai Jordan	All
(Germany) H & R Team Dombek (Germany) Besapalast Team Dombek	Mini John Cooper Works	49	(Germany) Henry W. Littig	1–5
(Germany) H & R Team Dombek (Germany) Besapalast Team Dombek	Mini John Cooper Works	57	(Germany) Thomas Tekaat	1–6
Privateer	Mini John Cooper Works	40	(Germany) Steven Fürsch	5
Privateer	Mini John Cooper Works	45	(Germany) Uwe Klapproth	8
(Germany) Frensch Power Motorsport	Mini John Cooper Works	41	(Germany) Steve Kirsch	All
(Germany) Frensch Power Motorsport	Mini John Cooper Works	55	(Germany) Bernhard Wagner	All
(Germany) Mini Racing Team	Mini John Cooper Works	44	(Germany) Dirk Lauth	1–7

== Race calendar and results ==
Round		Circuit	Date	Pole position	Fastest lap	Winning driver	Winning team
1	R1	(Germany) Motorsport Arena Oschersleben	27 April	(Russia) Mikhail Grachev	(Russia) Mikhail Grachev	(Russia) Mikhail Grachev	(Russia) A.M.G. Motorsport
1	R2	(Germany) Motorsport Arena Oschersleben	27 April		(Russia) Mikhail Grachev	(Russia) Mikhail Grachev	(Russia) A.M.G. Motorsport
2	R1	(Netherlands) Circuit Park Zandvoort	11 May	(Germany) Heiko Hammel	(Germany) Heiko Hammel	(Germany) Heiko Hammel	(Germany) Wolf Racing
2	R2	(Netherlands) Circuit Park Zandvoort	11 May		(Germany) Thomas Tekaat	(Germany) Thomas Tekaat	(Germany) Besapalast Team Dombek
3	R1	(Germany) Lausitzring	25 May	(Germany) Reinhard Nehls	(Germany) Heiko Hammel	(Germany) Heiko Hammel	(Germany) Wolf Racing
3	R2	(Germany) Lausitzring	25 May		(Germany) Heiko Hammel	(Germany) Heiko Hammel	(Germany) Wolf Racing
4	R1	(Austria) Red Bull Ring	8 June	(Switzerland) Markus Huggler	(Switzerland) Markus Huggler	(Switzerland) Markus Huggler	(Switzerland) Huggler Motorsport
4	R2	(Austria) Red Bull Ring	8 June		(Switzerland) Markus Huggler	(Germany) Heiko Hammel	(Germany) Wolf Racing
5	R1	(Germany) Nürburgring	20 June	(Germany) Jens Guido Weimann	(Switzerland) Markus Huggler	(Switzerland) Markus Huggler	(Switzerland) Huggler Motorsport
5	R2	(Germany) Nürburgring	20 June		(Switzerland) Markus Huggler	(Germany) Jens Guido Weimann	(Germany) Thate Motorsport
6	R1	(Germany) Hockenheimring	26 July	(Germany) Charlie Geipel	(Germany) Charlie Geipel	(Germany) Charlie Geipel	(Germany) Yaco Racing
6	R2	(Germany) Hockenheimring	26 July		(Germany) Charlie Geipel	(Germany) Charlie Geipel	(Germany) Yaco Racing
7	R1	(Germany) Nürburgring	31 August	(Switzerland) Peter Rikli	(Germany) Joachim Schirra	(Switzerland) Peter Rikli	(Switzerland) Rikli Motorsport
7	R2	(Germany) Nürburgring	31 August		(Switzerland) Peter Rikli	(Switzerland) Peter Rikli	(Switzerland) Rikli Motorsport
8	R1	(Germany) Sachsenring	21 September	(Germany) Charlie Geipel	(Germany) Charlie Geipel	(Germany) Charlie Geipel	(Germany) Yaco Racing
8	R2	(Germany) Sachsenring	21 September		(Germany) Charlie Geipel	(Germany) Charlie Geipel	(Germany) Yaco Racing

== Championship standings ==
=== Drivers' Championship ===
Pos	Driver	OSC (Germany)		ZAN (Netherlands)		LAU (Germany)		RBR (Austria)		NÜR (Germany)		HOC (Germany)		NÜR (Germany)		SAC (Germany)		Points
Division 1
1	(Germany) Heiko Hammel	5	3	1	1	1	1	2	1	2	3	7	DNS	4	5	3	2	107
2	(Germany) Reinhard Nehls	4	4	2	2	2	2	3	Ret	3	4	2	2	5	4	4	3	95
3	(Croatia) Franjo Kovac	3	5	3	4	3	3	5	2	5	6	5	4	6	3	5	5	78
4	(Germany) Johannes Leidinger			5	DNS	Ret	4	4	3	4	5	3	3	3	6	2	4	63
5	(Germany) Charlie Geipel											1	1			1	1	40
6	(Switzerland) Markus Huggler							1	4	1	2							33
7	(Germany) Joachim Schirra											4	5	2	2			25
8	(Russia) Mikhail Grachev	1	1															20
8	(Switzerland) Peter Rikli													1	1			20
10	(Germany) Arno Dahm	6	6							6	7	6	6					17
11	(Russia) Mikhail Stepanov	2	2															16
12	(Germany) Guido Thierfelder			4	3									8	7			14
13	(Germany) Jens Guido Weimann									Ret	1							10
14	(Italy) Dario Pergolini													7	Ret			2
Division 2
1	(Germany) Alexander Rambow	1	1	1	1	1	1	1	1	1	1	1	1	1	2	2	4	151
2	(Germany) Andreas Rinke	2	2	5	4	2	2	2	3	2	3	3	2	DNS	4	4	3	99
3	(Germany) Ralf Glatzel	4	5	4	2	4	3	5	4	Ret	2	2	Ret	3	3	3	1	86
4	(Belarus) Yury Krauchuk	5	4	2	DNS	5	Ret					Ret	3	2	1			45
5	(Denmark) Thomas Krebs	6	6	3	3	3	4	4	DNS									34
6	(Germany) Nils Mierschke							3	2							1	2	32
7	(Germany) Ronny Reinsberger	7	7			6	6			3	4	DNS	DNS			5	5	29
8	(Germany) Michael Kowalski	8	DNS							4	6					6	6	15
9	(Germany) Guido Thierfelder	3	3															12
10	(Germany) Norbert Heinz											4	4					10
11	(Germany) Olaf Müller	9	8							5	5							9
12	(Germany) Steffen Schwan											5	5			DNS	DNS	8
13	(Germany) Arno Dahm			6	5													7
14	(Germany) Michael Krings					7	5											6
	(Luxembourg) Gilles Bruckner													Ret	Ret			0
Division 3
1	(Germany) Steve Kirsch	1	2	Ret	3	1	2	1	1	1	1	2	1	1	1	3	1	136
2	(Germany) Kai Jordan	4	4	2	2	3	4	3	2	4	3	3	3	2	2	2	2	106
3	(Germany) Thomas Tekaat	2	1	1	1	2	1	2	3	2	2	1	2					104
4	(Germany) Dirk Lauth	6	5	4	4	8	3	4	5	3	Ret	4	4	7	5	1	8	66
5	(Austria) Bernhard Wagner	5	6	3	6	5	5	5	6	5	8	5	5	DNS	DNS	4	4	54
6	(Germany) Henry W. Littig	3	3	8	5	4	8	7	4	7	Ret							32
7	(Germany) Victoria Froß	Ret	Ret	7	9	9	9	8	8	8	5	7	6	4	4	5	5	32
8	(Germany) Michael Heide	8	8	6	8	7	7			9	7	6	7	3	6	7	6	31
9	(Germany) Lisa Christin Bruner	7	7	5	7	6	6	6	7	6	4							29
10	(Germany) Lothar Sausemuth													5	3			10
11	(Germany) Uwe Klapproth															6	3	9
12	(Germany) Ingo Kampmann													6	7	8	7	8
13	(Germany) Steven Fürsch									Ret	6							3
Pos	Driver	OSC (Germany)		ZAN (Netherlands)		LAU (Germany)		RBR (Austria)		NÜR (Germany)		HOC (Germany)		NÜR (Germany)		SAC (Germany)		Points

Colour	Result
Gold	Winner
Silver	Second place
Bronze	Third place
Green	Points finish
Blue	Non-points finish
Blue	Non-classified finish (NC)
Purple	Retired (Ret)
Red	Did not qualify (DNQ)
Red	Did not pre-qualify (DNPQ)
Black	Disqualified (DSQ)
White	Did not start (DNS)
White	Withdrew (WD)
White	Race cancelled (C)
Blank	Did not practice (DNP)
Blank	Did not arrive (DNA)
Blank	Excluded (EX)

=== Teams' Championship ===
Pos	Team	OSC (Germany)		ZAN (Netherlands)		LAU (Germany)		RBR (Austria)		NÜR (Germany)		HOC (Germany)		NÜR (Germany)		SAC (Germany)		Points
Division 1
1	(Germany) Wolf Racing	5	3	1	1	1	1	2	1	2	3	7	DNS	4	5	3	2	107
2	(Germany) Team Dombek	3	4	2	2	2	2	3	2	3	4	2	2	5	3	4	3	105
3	(Germany) LB-Racing			5	DNS	Ret	4	4	3	4	5	3	3	3	6	2	4	64
4	(Russia) A.M.G. Motorsport	1	1															20
5	(Germany) ETH Tuning 3	6	6							6	7	6	6					17
Division 2
1	(Germany) ETH Tuning 1	1	1	1	1	1	1	1	1	1	1	1	1	1	2	2	3	152
2	(Germany) Glatzel Racing 2	4	5	4	2	4	3	5	4	3	2	2	Ret	3	3	3	1	92
3	(Germany) Glatzel Racing 1	5	4	2	3	3	4	4	DNS			Ret	3	2	1			63
4	(Germany) Kowalski Racing	8	DNS							4	6					6	6	15
5	(Germany) ETH Tuning 2	3	3															12
6	(Germany) Lafia Motorsport	9	8							5	5							9
Pos	Team	OSC (Germany)		ZAN (Netherlands)		LAU (Germany)		RBR (Austria)		NÜR (Germany)		HOC (Germany)		NÜR (Germany)		SAC (Germany)		Points

Colour	Result
Gold	Winner
Silver	Second place
Bronze	Third place
Green	Points finish
Blue	Non-points finish
Blue	Non-classified finish (NC)
Purple	Retired (Ret)
Red	Did not qualify (DNQ)
Red	Did not pre-qualify (DNPQ)
Black	Disqualified (DSQ)
White	Did not start (DNS)
White	Withdrew (WD)
White	Race cancelled (C)
Blank	Did not practice (DNP)
Blank	Did not arrive (DNA)
Blank	Excluded (EX)

Position	1st	2nd	3rd	4th	5th	6th	7th	8th
Points	10	8	6	5	4	3	2	1
