= Viet Flakes =

- Directed by: Carolee Schneemann
- Cinematography: Carolee Schneemann
- Edited by: Carolee Schneemann
- Music by: James Tenney
- Release date: January 21, 1967
- Running time: 7 minutes
- Country: United States

Viet Flakes is a 1967 American experimental short film by Carolee Schneemann. It is a collage of images of atrocities during the Vietnam War and was produced in protest against the war. Schneemann integrated the film into some of her performance-based works.

== Description ==
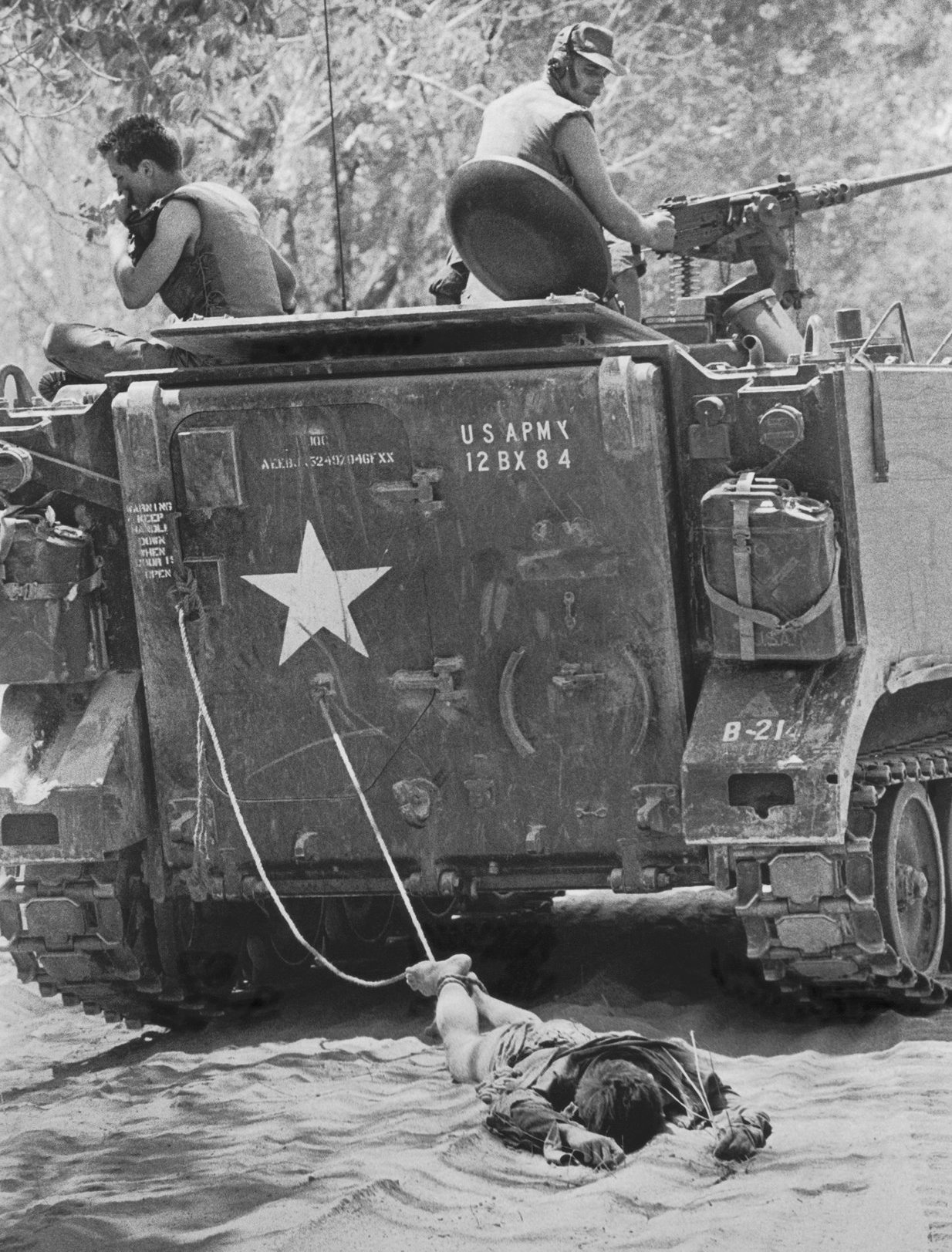
Viet Flakes uses war photographs, including this picture by Kyōichi Sawada, as its source material.

Viet Flakes shows news photographs from the Vietnam War. These images include Kyōichi Sawada's photograph of an American armored personnel carrier dragging a Viet Cong soldier and Sean Flynn's photograph of South Vietnamese soldiers conducting an interrogation on a man hanging from his ankles.

The film's soundtrack is a collage of contemporary popular music, Vietnamese folk music, and Western classical music. It includes recordings of the Beatles' "We Can Work It Out", Jackie DeShannon's "What the World Needs Now Is Love", Bobby Hebb, Chuck Berry, ? and the Mysterians, Bach's Jesu, der du meine Seele, BWV 78, and Mozart's Piano Concerto No. 20.

== Production ==
For five years, Schneemann accumulated images from newspapers and magazines showing atrocities from the Vietnam War. She began creating Viet Flakes as part of Snows, a performance piece. Schneemann borrowed a movie camera from filmmaker Ken Jacobs. Since it lacked a close-up lens, she bought magnifying glasses which she attached to the camera lens using tape. She shot movies of still images while manipulating the lenses, bringing the images in and out of focus and giving them a sense of motion. The soundtrack was made by her partner James Tenney, from a set of recordings jointly selected by the couple. Schneemann said she used popular music to create "something grating and contradictory" that would "put the paradox of our normal sound environment against the militaristic insanity of the war."

== Release ==
=== Snows ===
Viet Flakes was first shown on January 21, 1967, in Schneemann's six-person performance work Snows, presented at the Martinique Theater in New York City as part of Angry Arts Week. The performance made use of three 16 mm projectors, audio tapes, a color organ, and a strobe light. Schneemann worked with technicians from Bell Telephone Laboratories to develop a system in which the audience unknowingly controlled the electrical equipment. Contact microphones attached to the seats fed signals into silicon-controlled rectifiers that changed the speed of projection based on the audience's physical response.

The performers wore white clothes, and the stage was decorated with white materials. As Snows began, they gathered to watch a 1949 Castle Films newsreel showing battles and violent events. The performers then moved each other's bodies and applied white greasepaint, as the audio for Viet Flakes played. Another tape followed, containing the sound of train whistles and Schneemann experiencing an orgasm. The "T&O" tape was edited by Tenney from a recording of the couple having sex, which they had made during their graduate studies. Later in Snows, the film was projected onto the performers alongside images of snow, surrounding the images of the war's impact in white negative space.

Participants in Angry Arts Week had conflicting opinions about the use of images of war atrocities and the role of art in the anti-war movement. Art scholar Erica Levin said Snows showed "ambivalence about the use of emotionally charged images, while remaining equally uncertain about the efficacy of information overload as a countervailing strategy." She noted that while the opening newsreel footage directly showed wartime events, some of the actions from the performance—hanging from a loop of rope, dragging performers across the stage, and binding limbs with foil—made only indirect reference to war and became clear during the projection of Viet Flakes.

=== Other performances ===
Schneemann also used the film in Round House, a happening presented during the Dialectics of Liberation Congress in London in July 1967. In Round House, performers entangled themselves in different materials. Toward the end of the happening, they lay on the floor and Viet Flakes was projected onto their bodies. Scholar Catherine Spencer described the film's use in Round House as a way to turn "cybernetic communication back on itself, taking a military discourse developed to increase the accuracy of missiles and instead using it to implement feedback systems that were committedly antiwar."

At the 1970 London International Underground Film Festival, Schneemann presented the eight-person group performance work Thames Crawling. It involved projecting Viet Flakes and Fuses onto the performers' bodies, with recordings from some of Schneemann's other films.

== Bibliography ==
- Kahn, Douglas; Higgins, Hannah (2023). Mainframe Experimentalism: Early Computing and the Foundations of the Digital Arts. University of California Press. ISBN 978-0-520-26837-1.
- Levin, Erica (2007). "Sounding Snows: Bodily Static and the Politics of Visibility During the Vietnam War". In Cateforis, David; Duval, Steven; Steiner, Shepherd (eds.). Hybrid Practices: Art in Collaboration with Science and Technology in the Long 1960s. University of California Press. ISBN 978-0-520-29659-6.
- Serra, M. M.; Ramey, Kathryn (2007). "Eye/Body: The Cinematic Paintings of Carolee Schneemann". In Blaetz, Robin (ed.). Women's Experimental Cinema: Critical Frameworks. Duke University Press. ISBN 978-0-8223-4023-2.
- Spencer, Catherine (2020). Beyond the Happening: Performance Art and the Politics of Communication. Manchester University Press. ISBN 978-1-5261-4445-4.
- Suárez, Juan A. (2024). Experimental Film and Queer Materiality. Oxford University Press. ISBN 978-0-19-777380-2.
- Wannamaker, Robert (2021). The Music of James Tenney: Volume 1. University of Illinois Press. ISBN 978-0-252-04367-3.
