= Plumb Line =

- Directed by: Carolee Schneemann
- Narrated by: Carolee Schneemann
- Cinematography: Carolee Schneemann
- Edited by: Carolee Schneemann
- Release date: 1971
- Running time: 15 minutes
- Country: United States
- Language: English

Plumb Line is a 1971 American experimental short film directed by Carolee Schneemann.

== Description ==
The film's introduction opens with the image of a bronze plumb bob, hanging in front of a screen showing a man's face. Images of the man burn, and Schneemann writes the film's title on a window before wiping it away. The rest of the film comprises five sections depicting interior spaces, Schneemann exploring Venice, a cat in the Piazza San Marco, the man, and the dissolution of Schneemann and the man's relationship. It ends with a reprisal of the introductory section.

The film's imagery is presented in full frame or segmented into quadrants.

== Production ==
Schneemann began working on Plumb Line in 1968, after the end of a relationship. She used scraps of sound and Super 8 footage captured in New York, London, and Venice. Her narration was recorded in her studio on a tape recorder in what she described as "a state of emotional collapse triggered by the endless Vietnam atrocities and the dissolution of my long relationship with [James] Tenney."

Schneemann carried out the optical printing at the London Film-Makers' Co-op, using an old step-printer she had persuaded a patron to donate.

== Release and reception ==
Plumb Line was screened with Fuses (1967) at the 1977 Telluride Film Festival, as part of a program titled "The Erotic Woman" and introduced by Stan Brakhage. In protest of the festival's curatorial decisions, Schneemann staged an action based on her 1975 performance piece Interior Scroll. Painted with mud from Telluride, she stood on a small stage and read a scroll with the text of her film Kitch's Last Meal as she pulled it from her vagina.

Schneemann grouped Plumb Line with Fuses and Kitch's Last Meal to form her Autobiographical Trilogy. Although the three works were conceived independently, she began to consider them part of a larger work after Anthony McCall and Bruce McPherson pointed out their thematic similarities.

Film scholar Scott MacDonald analyzed Plumb Line as a contrapuntal arrangement of images and sounds in which many of the components appear multiple times, their meaning transformed by new contexts. He proposed that, in dealing with the aftermath of a relationship, Schneemann's attention to framing was a technique "to define clear limits for the experience".

== Bibliography ==
- Elder, R. Bruce (1997). A Body of Vision: Representations of the Body in Recent Film and Poetry. Wilfrid Laurier University Press. ISBN 978-0-88920-276-4.
- MacDonald, Scott (1988). A Critical Cinema: Interviews with Independent Filmmakers. University of California Press. ISBN 978-0-520-05800-2.
- Serra, M. M.; Ramey, Kathryn (2007). "Eye/Body: The Cinematic Paintings of Carolee Schneemann". In Blaetz, Robin (ed.). Women's Experimental Cinema: Critical Frameworks. Duke University Press. ISBN 978-0-8223-4023-2.
