= 2010 ADAC Procar Series =

Motor racing competition in Germany

Seasons
- ← 2009 2011 →

The 2010 ADAC Procar Series season was the sixteenth season of the ADAC Procar Series, the German championship for Super 2000 touring cars. The season consisted of eight separate race weekends with two races each, spread over six different tracks.

The series struggled for numbers in 2010 with the series failing to attract a dozen competitors to any of its events. BMW drivers Roland Hertner and Johannes Leidinger finished tied on points with Hertner claiming the title on countback.

== Teams and drivers ==
| Team | Car | No. | Drivers | Rounds |
|---|---|---|---|---|
| (Germany) Liqui Moly Team Engstler | BMW 320si E90 | 3 | (Russia) Andrei Romanov | 6, 8 |
| (Germany) Liqui Moly Team Engstler | BMW 320si E90 | 4 | (Russia) Rustem Teregulov | All |
| (Germany) Liqui Moly Team Engstler | BMW 320si E90 | 5 | (Germany) Roland Hertner | All |
| (Germany) Junior Team Engstler | BMW 320i E46 | 6 | (Germany) Florian Spengler | All |
| (Germany) Junior Team Engstler | BMW 320si E90 | 7 | (Germany) Johannes Leidinger | All |
| (Germany) TFS Yaco Racing | Toyota Auris S2000 | 8 | (Russia) Oleg Petrishin | All |
| (Germany) TFS Yaco Racing | Toyota Corolla S2000 | 9 | (Russia) Michail Stepanov | 1, 3–8 |
| (Germany) TFS Yaco Racing | Toyota Auris S2000 | 10 | (Germany) Charlie Geipel | 7 |
| (Switzerland) Rikli Motorsport | Honda Civic Type R | 11 | (Switzerland) Stephan Zbinden | 1, 3, 5 |
| (Switzerland) Rikli Motorsport | Honda Accord 2.0 | 12 | (Switzerland) Peter Rikli | 3–8 |
| (Switzerland) Rikli Motorsport | Honda Accord Euro R | 13 | (Switzerland) Jörg Schori | 1, 3, 5 |
| (Germany) Thate Motorsport | Mercedes C200 | 14 | (Germany) Jens Guido Weimann | 1–3, 7–8 |
| (Germany) Mayer Motorsport | Audi A4 | 15 | (Germany) Oliver Mayer | 3–6 |
| (Russia) Tsunami RT | BMW 320si E46 | 16 | (Ukraine) Andrii Kruglyk | 4–5 |

== Race calendar and results ==
| Round | | Circuit | Date | Pole position | Fastest lap | Winning driver | Winning team |
|---|---|---|---|---|---|---|---|
| 1 | R1 | (Germany) Motorsport Arena Oschersleben | 10 April | (Germany) Roland Hertner | (Germany) Johannes Leidinger | (Germany) Roland Hertner | (Germany) Liqui Moly Team Engstler |
| 1 | R2 | (Germany) Motorsport Arena Oschersleben | 11 April | | (Germany) Florian Spengler | (Germany) Roland Hertner | (Germany) Liqui Moly Team Engstler |
| 2 | R1 | (Germany) Sachsenring | 8 May | (Germany) Johannes Leidinger | (Germany) Johannes Leidinger | (Germany) Florian Spengler | (Germany) Junior Team Engstler |
| 2 | R2 | (Germany) Sachsenring | 9 May | | (Germany) Johannes Leidinger | (Germany) Roland Hertner | (Germany) Liqui Moly Team Engstler |
| 3 | R1 | (Germany) Hockenheimring | 29 May | (Russia) Rustem Teregulov | (Russia) Rustem Teregulov | (Germany) Johannes Leidinger | (Germany) Junior Team Engstler |
| 3 | R2 | (Germany) Hockenheimring | 30 May | | (Germany) Oliver Mayer | (Germany) Oliver Mayer | (Germany) Mayer Motorsport |
| 4 | R1 | (Netherlands) TT Circuit Assen | 17 July | (Germany) Roland Hertner | (Germany) Florian Spengler | (Germany) Johannes Leidinger | (Germany) Junior Team Engstler |
| 4 | R2 | (Netherlands) TT Circuit Assen | 18 July | | (Germany) Florian Spengler | (Germany) Florian Spengler | (Germany) Junior Team Engstler |
| 5 | R1 | (Austria) Salzburgring | 24 July | (Germany) Oliver Mayer | (Germany) Roland Hertner | (Ukraine) Andrii Kruglyk | (Russia) Tsunami RT |
| 5 | R2 | (Austria) Salzburgring | 25 July | | (Ukraine) Andrii Kruglyk | (Germany) Roland Hertner | (Germany) Liqui Moly Team Engstler |
| 6 | R1 | (Germany) EuroSpeedway Lausitz | 14 August | (Germany) Florian Spengler | (Russia) Andrei Romanov | (Russia) Andrei Romanov | (Germany) Liqui Moly Team Engstler |
| 6 | R2 | (Germany) EuroSpeedway Lausitz | 15 August | | (Germany) Florian Spengler | (Russia) Andrei Romanov | (Germany) Liqui Moly Team Engstler |
| 7 | R1 | (Germany) Motorsport Arena Oschersleben | 4 September | (Germany) Florian Spengler | (Germany) Florian Spengler | (Germany) Charlie Geipel | (Germany) TFS Yaco Racing |
| 7 | R2 | (Germany) Motorsport Arena Oschersleben | 5 September | | (Germany) Florian Spengler | (Germany) Florian Spengler | (Germany) Junior Team Engstler |
| 8 | R1 | (Germany) Motorsport Arena Oschersleben | 2 October | (Germany) Roland Hertner | (Germany) Roland Hertner | (Germany) Roland Hertner | (Germany) Liqui Moly Team Engstler |
| 8 | R2 | (Germany) Motorsport Arena Oschersleben | 3 October | | (Russia) Andrei Romanov | (Russia) Andrei Romanov | (Germany) Liqui Moly Team Engstler |

== Championship standings ==
| Pos | Driver | OSC (Germany) | | SAC (Germany) | | HOC (Germany) | | ASS (Netherlands) | | SAL (Austria) | | LAU (Germany) | | OSC (Germany) | | OSC (Germany) | | Points |
|---|---|---|---|---|---|---|---|---|---|---|---|---|---|---|---|---|---|---|
| 1 | (Germany) Roland Hertner | **1** | 1 | 2 | 1 | 5 | 2 | **6** | 5 | 2 | 1 | 9 | 2 | Ret | 4 | **1** | 2 | 106 |
| 2 | (Germany) Johannes Leidinger | 2 | 4 | **3** | 2 | 1 | 3 | 1 | 3 | 4 | 2 | 2 | 4 | Ret | 2 | 2 | 4 | 106 |
| 3 | (Germany) Florian Spengler | 3 | 2 | 1 | 3 | 3 | 4 | 2 | 1 | 6 | 3 | **4** | 5 | **4** | 1 | 4 | 3 | 103 |
| 4 | (Russia) Rustem Teregulov | 5 | Ret | Ret | DNS | **4** | 5 | Ret | DNS | 5 | 4 | 3 | 3 | 3 | 6 | Ret | DNS | 43 |
| 5 | (Germany) Oliver Mayer | | | | | 2 | 1 | 3 | 4 | **3** | 6 | 7 | Ret | | | | | 40 |
| 6 | (Russia) Andrei Romanov | | | | | | | | | | | 1 | 1 | | | 3 | 1 | 36 |
| 7 | (Switzerland) Peter Rikli | | | | | 10 | Ret | 5 | Ret | Ret | 9 | 5 | 6 | 2 | 5 | 5 | 5 | 31 |
| 8 | (Germany) Jens Guido Weimann | 4 | 3 | Ret | 5 | 6 | 10 | | | | | | | 5 | 7 | 6 | 6 | 30 |
| 9 | (Russia) Michail Stepanov | 6 | 5 | | | 9 | 6 | 7 | 6 | 7 | 5 | 6 | 8 | Ret | DNS | 7 | 7 | 29 |
| 10 | (Ukraine) Andrii Kruglyk | | | | | | | 4 | 2 | 1 | 8 | | | | | | | 24 |
| 11 | (Russia) Oleg Petrishin | 8 | 7 | Ret | 4 | 8 | 8 | 8 | 7 | 8 | 7 | 8 | 7 | Ret | DNS | 8 | 8 | 21 |
| 12 | (Germany) Charlie Geipel | | | | | | | | | | | | | 1 | 3 | | | 16 |
| 13 | (Switzerland) Stephan Zbinden | 7 | 6 | | | Ret | 9 | | | 9 | DNS | | | | | | | 5 |
| 14 | (Switzerland) Jörg Schori | 9 | 8 | | | 7 | 7 | | | Ret | DNS | | | | | | | 5 |
| Pos | Driver | OSC (Germany) | | SAC (Germany) | | HOC (Germany) | | ASS (Netherlands) | | SAL (Austria) | | LAU (Germany) | | OSC (Germany) | | OSC (Germany) | | Points |

| Colour | Result |
|---|---|
| Gold | Winner |
| Silver | Second place |
| Bronze | Third place |
| Green | Points classification |
| Blue | Non-points classification |
| Blue | Non-classified finish (NC) |
| Purple | Retired, not classified (Ret) |
| Red | Did not qualify (DNQ) |
| Red | Did not pre-qualify (DNPQ) |
| Black | Disqualified (DSQ) |
| White | Did not start (DNS) |
| White | Withdrew (WD) |
| White | Race cancelled (C) |
| Blank | Did not practice (DNP) |
| Blank | Did not arrive (DNA) |
| Blank | Excluded (EX) |

**Bold** – Pole
Italics – Fastest lap

| Position | 1st | 2nd | 3rd | 4th | 5th | 6th | 7th | 8th |
| Points | 10 | 8 | 6 | 5 | 4 | 3 | 2 | 1 |
