= Chiyoko Szlavnics =

Canadian experimental composer (born 1967)

Chiyoko Szlavnics (born 1967 in Toronto, Ontario) is a Canadian experimental composer currently based in Berlin, Germany.

== Education and career ==
Szlavnics graduated with honours in 1989 from the University of Toronto Faculty of Music, where she studied with James Tenney, and moved to Berlin ten years later. Her work often employs forms derived from visual art.
