= Daniel Corral (composer) =

American composer and musician

Daniel Corral (born 1981) is a Filipino-American composer and musician.

== Biography ==
Corral was born in Eagle River, Alaska, United States, in 1981. Corral went to Los Angeles in 2005 as a percussionist/composer. He holds an M.F.A. in music from the California Institute of the Arts (2007) and a B.M. from the University of Puget Sound (2004). While at Calarts he studied composition with Anne LeBaron and James Tenney. His musical voice finds outlet in puppet operas, accordion orchestras, handmade music boxes, player pianos, electronic collages, site-specific installations, chamber music, and interdisciplinary collaborations.

The Los Angeles Times described the premiere at Zipper Hall of his Sigils for solo piano as "the recital's strongest piece. Sigils boasts a fascinating -- and somewhat split -- personality, with its mixtures of rhythmic data-dancing systems and more visceral, clustered fistfuls-of-notes, hazy keyboard cloud activity, and a deceptive 'resolving chord' (with a flatted second in the bass)".

His second puppet opera, Zoophilic Follies, premiered in September 2011 at REDCAT and featured Timur and the Dime Museum along with other musical guests. His first puppet opera, Le Petit Macabre, premiered in 2008 at St. Ann's Warehouse, Brooklyn as part of the Great Small Works Toy Theatre Festival. It was inspired by György Ligeti's opera Le Grand Macabre.

He also composes, arranges, and plays accordion/electronics in Timur and the Dime Museum, a music ensemble featuring operatic tenor Timur Bekbosunov, clarinetist Brian Walsh, violist Cassia Streb, guitarist Matthew Setzer, bassist David Tranchina, and drummer Andrew Lessman.
