= James Tenney =

American composer and music theorist (1934–2006)

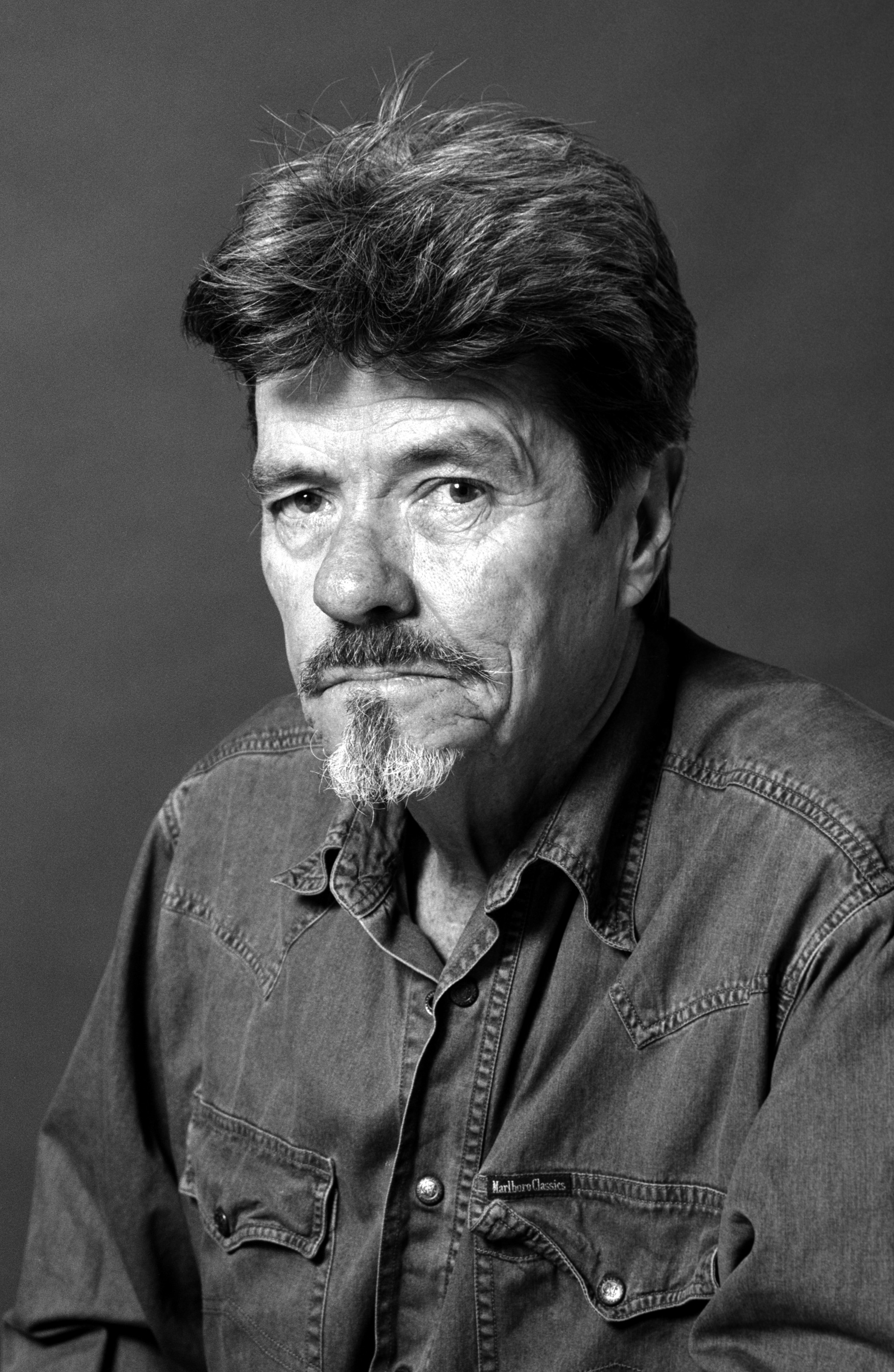
James Tenney

James Tenney (August 10, 1934 – August 24, 2006) was an American composer, music theorist, and pianist. He made significant early musical contributions to plunderphonics, sound synthesis, algorithmic composition, process music, spectral music, and microtonal tuning systems including extended just intonation. His theoretical writings variously concern musical form, texture, timbre, consonance and dissonance, and harmonic perception.

== Biography ==
James Tenney was born on August 10, 1934, in Silver City, New Mexico, and grew up in Arizona and Colorado. He attended the University of Denver, the Juilliard School, Bennington College (from which he earned a Bachelor of Arts degree in 1958), and the University of Illinois Urbana-Champaign (from which he earned a Master of Arts degree in 1961). He studied piano with Eduard Steuermann and composition with Chou Wen-chung, Lionel Nowak, Paul Boepple, Henry Brant, Carl Ruggles, Kenneth Gaburo, John Cage, Harry Partch, and Edgard Varèse. He also studied acoustics, information theory, and electroacoustic composition under Lejaren Hiller. In 1961, Tenney completed an influential master's thesis entitled Meta (+) Hodos that made one of the earliest applications of gestalt theory and cognitive science to music. His later writings include "Temporal gestalt perception in music" in the Journal of Music Theory, the chapter "John Cage and the Theory of Harmony" in Writings about John Cage, and the book A History of Consonance and Dissonance, among others.

Tenney's earliest works show the influence of Ruggles, Varèse, and Anton Webern; a gradual assimilation of the ideas of John Cage influenced the development of his music in the 1960s. In 1961, he composed the early plunderphonic composition Collage No.1 (Blue Suede) by manipulating Elvis Presley's recording of "Blue Suede Shoes". His work from 1961 to 1964 was largely computer music completed at Bell Labs with Max Mathews; as such, it constitutes one of the earliest significant bodies of algorithmically composed and computer-synthesized music. Examples include Analog #1 (Noise Study) (1961) and Phases (1963).

Tenney lived in or near New York City throughout the 1960s, where he was actively involved with Fluxus, the Judson Dance Theater, and the ensemble Tone Roads, which he co-founded with Malcolm Goldstein and Philip Corner. He was exceptionally dedicated to the music of American composer Charles Ives, many of whose compositions he conducted; his interpretation of Ives' Piano Sonata No. 2 was much praised. He collaborated closely as both musician and actor with his then-partner, the multimedia artist Carolee Schneemann, until their separation in 1968. With Schneemann he co-starred in Fuses, a 1967 silent film largely assembled from sequences of their lovemaking. Tenney created the sound collage soundtracks for Schneemann's films Viet Flakes (1965) and Snows (1970), and also appeared in the New York City production of her performance piece Meat Joy (1964).

In 1967, Tenney gave an influential Fortran workshop for a group of composers and Fluxus artists that included Steve Reich, Nam June Paik, Dick Higgins, Jackson Mac Low, Joseph Byrd, Phil Corner, Alison Knowles, and Max Neuhaus. Tenney was one of four performers of Steve Reich's Pendulum Music (1967) on May 27, 1969, at the Whitney Museum of American Art, alongside Michael Snow, Richard Serra, and Bruce Nauman. Tenney also performed with Harry Partch in a production of Partch's The Bewitched in 1959, alongside John Cage, Reich, and Philip Glass.

All of Tenney's compositions after 1970 are instrumental music (occasionally with tape delay), and most since 1972 reflect an interest in harmonic perception and microtonality. Significant works include Clang (1972) for orchestra; Quintext (1972) for string quintet; Spectral CANON for CONLON Nancarrow (1974) for player piano; Glissade (1982) for viola, cello, double bass, and tape delay system; Bridge (1982–84) for two pianos eight hands in a microtonal tuning system; Changes (1985) for six harps tuned a sixth of a semitone apart; Critical Band (1988) for variable instrumentation; and In a Large Open Space (1994) for variable instrumentation. His pieces were often tributes to other composers or colleagues and subtitled as such.

Tenney taught at the Polytechnic Institute of Brooklyn, Yale University, the California Institute of the Arts, the University of California, Santa Cruz, and York University in Toronto. His students include John Luther Adams, John Bischoff, Michael Byron, Allison Cameron, Raven Chacon, Daniel Corral, Miguel Frasconi, Peter Garland, Douglas Kahn, Carson Kievman, Julie King, Catherine Lamb, Ingram Marshall, Andra McCartney, Charlemagne Palestine, Larry Polansky, Marc Sabat, Carl Stone, Chiyoko Szlavnics, Eric de Visscher, Tashi Wada, and Michael Winter. (See: List of music students by teacher: T to Z#James Tenney.)

Tenney died of lung cancer on August 24, 2006, in Santa Clarita, California, aged 72.

== Selected recordings ==
=== As sole composer ===
- The Music Of James Tenney: Selected Works 1963–1984 (1984, Musicworks)
- Selected Works 1961–1969 (1992, Frog Peak Music)
- Bridge and Flocking (1996, hat ART)
- The Solo Works for Percussion (1998, Matthias Kaul, hat ART)
- Music for Violin and Piano (1999, hat ART)
- Forms 1–4: In Memoriam Edgar Varèse, John Cage, Stefan Wolpe, Morton Feldman (2002, Ensemble Musikfabrik, hat ART)
- Pika-Don (2004, hat ART)
- Postal Pieces (2004, The Barton Workshop, New World Records)
- Melody, Ergodicity And Indeterminacy (2007, The Barton Workshop, Mode Records)
- Arbor Vitæ: Quatuors + Quintettes (2008, Quatuor Bozzini)
- Spectrum Pieces (2009, The Barton Workshop, New World Records)
- Old School: James Tenney (2010, Zeitkratzer)
- Having Never Written a Note for Percussion (2015, Rrose, Further Records)
- Bass Works (2016, Dario Calderone, hat ART)
- Harmonium (2018, Scordatura Ensemble, New World Records)

=== Individual works ===
- Saxony
  - David Mott, Composers Recordings, Inc. 1985
  - Henrik Frisk, Inventions of Solitude, Hornblower Recordings 1995
  - Ulrich Krieger, Walls of Sound, OODiscs 1996
  - Ryan Muncy, ism, Tundra/New Focus 2016
- Ergodos I For John Cage
  - James Tenney, A Chance Operation: The John Cage Tribute, Koch International Classics 1993
- Koan: Having Never Written a Note for Percussion
  - Sonic Youth, Goodbye 20th Century, SYR 1999
  - William Winant, Five American Percussion Pieces, Poon Village 2013

== Interviews ==
- Zimmerman, Walter, Desert Plants – Conversations with 23 American Musicians, Berlin: Beginner Press in cooperation with Mode Records, 2020 (originally published in 1976 by A.R.C., Vancouver). The 2020 edition includes a CD featuring the original interview recordings with Larry Austin, Robert Ashley, Jim Burton, John Cage, Philip Corner, Morton Feldman, Philip Glass, Joan La Barbara, Garrett List, Alvin Lucier, John McGuire, Charles Morrow, J. B. Floyd (on Conlon Nancarrow), Pauline Oliveros, Charlemagne Palestine, Ben Johnston (on Harry Partch), Steve Reich, David Rosenboom, Frederic Rzewski, Richard Teitelbaum, James Tenney, Christian Wolff, and La Monte Young.
- Hermits of Re-Tuning (Show 115) James Tenney interviewed on Kalvos & Damian New Music Bazaar, August 2, 1997 (click to listen)
- James Tenney interviewed by American Mavericks (click to listen)
- James Tenney (May 8–11, 2005). "Postcards from the Edge". NewMusicBox (Interview). Interviewed by Frank J. Oteri (published June 1, 2005). (includes video)
