= Carolee Schneemann =

American visual experimental artist (1939–2019)

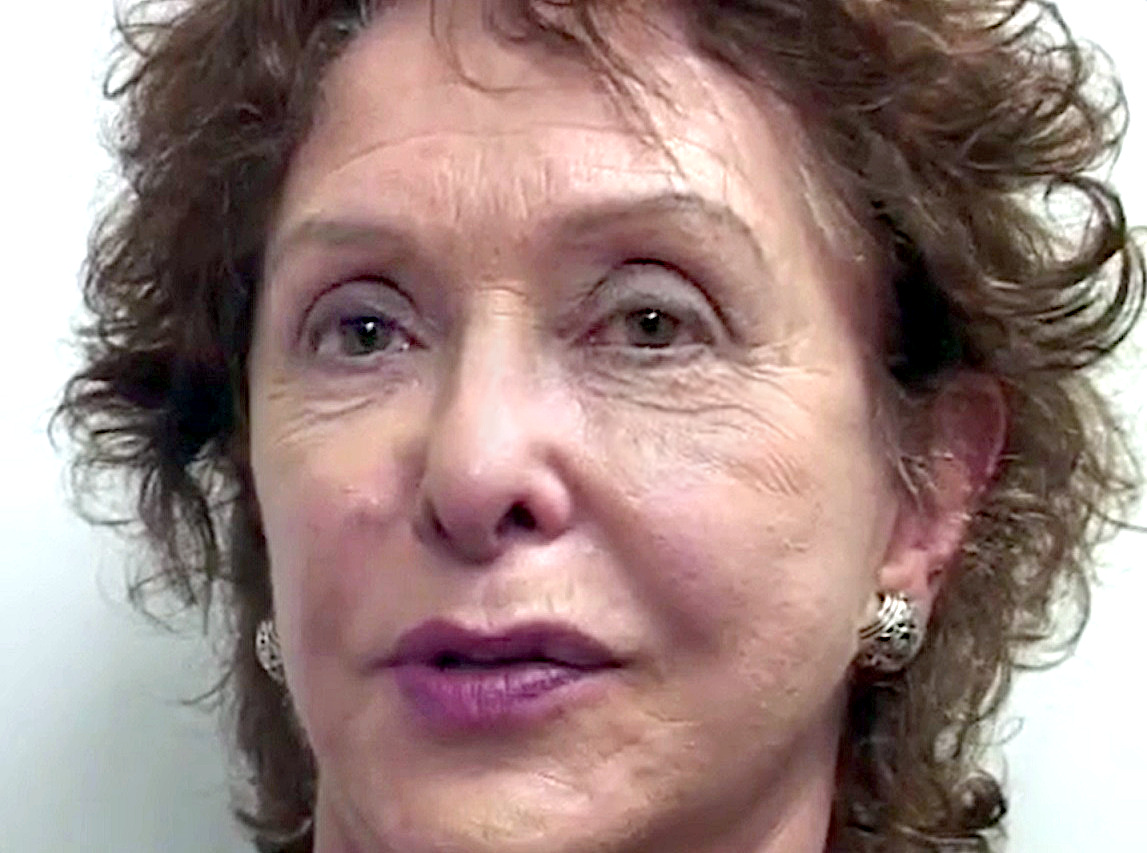
- Carolee Schneemann (c.2003)
- Born: October 12, 1939; Philadelphia, Pennsylvania, U.S.
- Died: March 6, 2019 (aged 79); New Paltz, New York, U.S.
- Education: Bard College (BA); University of Illinois, Urbana-Champaign (MFA)
- Known for: Visual art, performance art
- Movement: Feminist art, Neo-Dada, Fluxus, happening

Carolee Schneemann (October 12, 1939 – March 6, 2019) was an American visual experimental artist, known for her multi-media works on the body, narrative, sexuality and gender. She received a B.A. in poetry and philosophy from Bard College and a Master of Fine Arts from the University of Illinois. Originally a painter in the Abstract Expressionist tradition, Schneemann was uninterested in the masculine heroism of New York painters of the time and turned to performance-based work, primarily characterized by research into visual traditions, taboos, and the body of the individual in relation to social bodies. Although renowned for her work in performance and other media, Schneemann began her career as a painter, saying: "I'm a painter. I'm still a painter and I will die a painter. Everything that I have developed has to do with extending visual principles off the canvas." Her works have been shown at the Los Angeles Museum of Contemporary Art, the Museum of Modern Art in New York, the London National Film Theatre, and many other venues.

Keynote address given by Schneemann on October 23, 2008

Schneemann taught at several universities, including the California Institute of the Arts, the School of the Art Institute of Chicago, Hunter College, Rutgers University, and SUNY New Paltz. She also published widely, producing works such as Cézanne, She Was a Great Painter (1976) and More than Meat Joy: Performance Works and Selected Writings (1979). Her works have been associated with a variety of art classifications, including Fluxus, Neo-Dada, performance art, the Beat Generation, and happenings.

== Early life and education ==
Carolee Schneemann was born Carol Lee Schneiman on October 12, 1939, in the Fox Chase neighborhood of Philadelphia, where she was raised. Her childhood friends described her in retrospect as "a mad pantheist" due to her relationship with, and respect for, nature. As a young adult, Schneemann often visited the Philadelphia Museum of Art, where she cited her earliest connections between art and sexuality to her drawings from ages four and five, which she drew on her father's prescription tablets. Her family was generally supportive of her naturalness and freeness with her body. Schneemann attributed her father's support to the fact that he was a rural physician who had to often deal with the body in various states of health.

Schneemann was awarded a full scholarship to Bard College in Annandale-on-Hudson, New York. She was the first woman from her family to attend college, but her father discouraged her from an art education. While at Bard, Schneemann began to realize the differences between male and female perceptions of each other's bodies while serving as a nude model for her boyfriend's portraits and painting nude self-portraits. While on leave from Bard on a separate scholarship to Columbia University, she met the composer James Tenney, who was attending the Juilliard School, and the two became romantic partners and collaborators.

Her first experience with experimental film was through Tenney's lifelong friend Stan Brakhage. After graduating from Bard in 1962, Schneemann earned a Master of Fine Arts degree from the University of Illinois Urbana-Champaign, which Tenney had also attended.

Schneemann's image is included in the iconic 1972 collage Some Living American Women Artists by Mary Beth Edelson.

=== Early work ===
Schneemann began her art career as a painter in the late 1950s. Her painting began to adopt some of the characteristics of Neo-Dada art, as she used box structures coupled with expressionist brushwork. These constructs share the heavily textural characteristics in the work of artists such as Robert Rauschenberg. She described the atmosphere in the art community at this time as misogynistic and said that female artists of the time were not aware of their bodies. These works integrated the influence of artists such as Paul Cézanne and the abstract expressionists. Schneemann focused on expressiveness rather than accessibility or stylishness. But she still called herself a formalist, unlike other feminist artists who wanted to distance themselves from male-oriented art history. She is considered a "first-generation feminist artist", a group that also includes Mary Beth Edelson, Rachel Rosenthal, and Judy Chicago. They were part of the feminist art movement in Europe and the United States in the early 1970s that developed feminist writing and art. Schneemann became involved with the art movement of happenings when she organized A Journey through a Disrupted Landscape, inviting people to "crawl, climb, negotiate rocks, climb, walk, go through mud". Soon thereafter she met Allan Kaprow, the primary figure of happenings, in addition to artists Red Grooms and Jim Dine. Influenced by figures such as Simone de Beauvoir, Antonin Artaud, Maya Deren, Wilhelm Reich, and Kaprow, Schneemann found herself drawn away from painting.

In 1962, Schneemann moved with Tenney from their residence in Illinois to New York City, when Tenney began work at Bell Labs in New Jersey. Through one of Tenney's colleagues at Bell, Billy Klüver, Schneemann met New York art figures including Claes Oldenburg, Merce Cunningham, John Cage, and Robert Rauschenberg, which got her involved with the Judson Memorial Church's art program. There, she participated in works such as Oldenburg's Store Days (1962), and Robert Morris's Site (1964), where she played a living version of Édouard Manet's Olympia. She contributed to Oldenburg's happening, filmed by Stan VanDerBeek in upstate New York, Birth of the American Flag (1965). Around this time she began to self-represent her nude body in works, feeling that it needed to be reclaimed from the status of a cultural possession. Schneemann got to personally know many New York musicians and composers in the 1960s, including George Brecht, Malcolm Goldstein, Philip Glass, Terry Riley, and Steve Reich. She was also highly interested in the abstract expressionists of the time, such as Willem de Kooning. But despite her numerous connections in the art world, New York galleries and museums were not interested in Schneemann's painting-constructions. Oldenburg suggested that there would have been more interest in Europe. The first support for Schneemann's work came from poets such as Robert Kelly, David Antin, and Paul Blackburn, who published some of her writings.

Production on Schneemann's work Eye Body began in 1963. Schneemann created a "loft environment" filled with broken mirrors, motorized umbrellas, and rhythmic color units. To become part of the art herself, she covered herself in various materials, including grease, chalk, and plastic. She created 36 "transformative-actions"—photographs of herself in her constructed environment by Icelandic artist Erró. Among these images is a frontal nude featuring two garden snakes crawling on Schneemann's torso. This image drew particular attention both for its "archaic eroticism" and her visible clitoris. Schneemann said that at the time she did not know about the symbolism of the serpent in ancient cultures in figures such as the Minoan snake goddess figurines and, in fact, learned of it years later. Upon its presentation to the public in 1963, art critics found the piece lewd and pornographic. Artist Valie Export cites Eye Body for the way in which Schneemann portrays "how random fragments of her memory and personal elements of her environment are superimposed on her perception."

=== Film ===
Schneemann's 1964 performance piece Meat Joy revolved around eight partially nude figures dancing and playing with various objects and substances including wet paint, sausage, raw fish, scraps of paper, and raw chickens. It was first performed at the Festival de la Libre Expression in Paris and later filmed and photographed as performed by her Kinetic Theater group at Judson Memorial Church. She described the piece as an "erotic rite" and a "celebration of flesh as material." Meat Joy is like a happening in that they both use improvisation and focus on conception rather than execution. Though her work of the 1960s was more performance-based, she continued to build assemblages such as the Joseph Cornell-influenced Native Beauties (1962–64), Music Box Music (1964), and Pharaoh's Daughter (1966). Her Letter to Lou Andreas Salome (1965) expressed Schneemann's philosophical interests by combining scrawlings of Nietzsche and Tolstoy with a Rauschenberg-like form. Schneeman later said of the piece: "Sensuality was always confused with pornography. The old patriarchal morality of proper behaviour and improper behaviour had no threshold for the pleasures of physical contact that were not explicitly about sex."

In 1964, Schneemann began production of her 30-minute film Fuses, finishing it in 1967. Fuses portrayed her and Tenney (who also created the sound collages for Schneemann's Viet Flakes, 1965, and Snows, 1970) having sex as recorded by a 16 mm Bolex camera, as their cat, Kitch, observed nearby. Schneemann then altered the film by staining, burning, and directly drawing on the celluloid itself, mixing the concepts of painting and collage. The segments were edited together at varying speeds and superimposed with photographs of nature, which she juxtaposed against her and Tenney's bodies and sexual actions. Fuses was motivated by Schneemann's desire to know whether a woman's depiction of her own sexual acts was different from pornography and classical art as well as a reaction to Brakhage's depictions of sex and reproduction in Loving (1957), Cat's Cradle (1959) and Window Water Baby Moving (1959). Schneemann herself appeared in some Brakhage films, including Cat's Cradle, in which she wore an apron at Brakhage's insistence. Despite her friendship with Brakhage, she later called the experience of being in Cat's Cradle "frightening," remarking that "whenever I collaborated, went into a male friend's film, I always thought I would be able to hold my presence, maintain an authenticity. It was soon gone, lost in their celluloid dominance—a terrifying experience—experiences of true dissolution." She showed Fuses to her contemporaries as she worked on it in 1965 and 1966, receiving mostly positive feedback, but many critics described it as self-indulgent, "narcissistic exhibitionism". There were especially strong reactions to the film's depiction of cunnilingus. While Fuses is viewed as a "proto-feminist" film, Schneemann felt that feminist film historians largely neglected it. The film lacked the fetishism and objectification of the female body seen in much male-oriented pornography. Two years after its completion, it won a Cannes Film Festival Special Jury Selection prize. Pop artist Andy Warhol, with whom Schneemann was acquainted, having spent time at The Factory, drolly remarked that Schneemann should have taken the film to Hollywood. Fuses became the first film in Schneemann's Autobiographical Trilogy. Though her works of the 1960s shared many of the ideas of the concurrent Fluxus artists, she remained independent of any specific movement. They formed the groundwork for the feminist art movement of the late 1960s and 1970s.

Schneemann performing her piece Interior Scroll, 1975. Schneemann along with Yves Klein in France, and Yayoi Kusama, Charlotte Moorman, and Yoko Ono in New York City were pioneers of performance based works of art, which often entailed nudity.

Schneemann began work on her next film, Plumb Line (1971), in 1968. It opens with a still shot of a man's face with a plumb line in front of it before the entire image begins to burn. Various images including Schneemann and the man appear in different quadrants of the frame while a disorienting soundtrack of music, sirens, and cat noises, among other things, plays in the background. The sound and visuals grow more intense as the film progresses, with Schneemann narrating about a period of physical and emotional illness. The film ends with Schneemann attacking a series of projected images and a repetition of its opening segment. During a showing of Plumb Line at a women's film festival, it was booed for the image of the man at the beginning of the film.

From 1973 to 1976, in her ongoing piece Up to and Including Her Limits, a naked Schneemann is suspended from a tree surgeon's harness attached from the ceiling above a canvas. Using the motions of her body to make marks with a crayon, the artist maps time processes as a video monitor records her movement. She manually lowers and raises the rope on which she is suspended to reach all corners of the canvas. In this work, Schneemann addresses the male-dominated art world of Abstract Expressionism and Action painting, specifically work by Jackson Pollock and Willem de Kooning. Schneemann arrived at the museum when it opened, with the cleaners, guards, secretaries, maintenance crew, and remained until it closed. Through this practice she explored the political and personal implications of the museum space by enabling the place of art creation and art presentation to become one. Schneemann intended to do away with performance, a fixed audience, rehearsals, improvisation, sequences, conscious intention, technical cues, and a central metaphor or theme in order to explore what was left. In 1984, she completed the final video, a compilation of video footage from six performances: the Berkeley Museum, 1974; London Filmmaker's Cooperative, 1974; Artists Space, NY, 1974; Anthology Film Archives, NY, 1974; The Kitchen, NY, 1976; and the Studio Galerie, Berlin, 1976.

In 1975, Schneemann performed Interior Scroll in East Hampton, New York, and at the Telluride Film Festival. This was a notable Fluxus-influenced piece featuring her use of text and body. In her performance, Schneemann entered wrapped in a sheet, under which she wore an apron. She disrobed and then got on a table where she outlined her body with mud. Several times, she would take "action poses", similar to those in figure drawing classes. Concurrently, she read from her book Cézanne, She Was a Great Painter. Then she dropped the book and slowly extracted from her vagina a scroll from which she read. Schneeman's speech described a parody version of an encounter where she received criticism on her films for their "persistence of feelings" and "personal clutter". Art Historian David Hopkins suggests that this performance was a comment on "internalized criticism" and possibly "feminist interest" in female writing.

Schneemann's feminist scroll speech, according to performance theorist Jeanie Forte, made it seem as if Schneemann's "vagina itself is reporting [...] sexism". Art critic Robert C. Morgan wrote that it is necessary to acknowledge the period during which Interior Scroll was produced in order to understand it. He argues that by placing the source of artistic creativity at the female genitals, Schneemann changes the masculine overtones of minimalist art and conceptual art into a feminist exploration of her body. Interior Scroll, along with Judy Chicago's Dinner Party, helped pioneer many of the ideas later popularized by the off-broadway show The Vagina Monologues. In 1978, Schneemann finished the last film, Kitch's Last Meal, in what was later called her "Autobiographical Trilogy".

=== 1980s–2010s ===
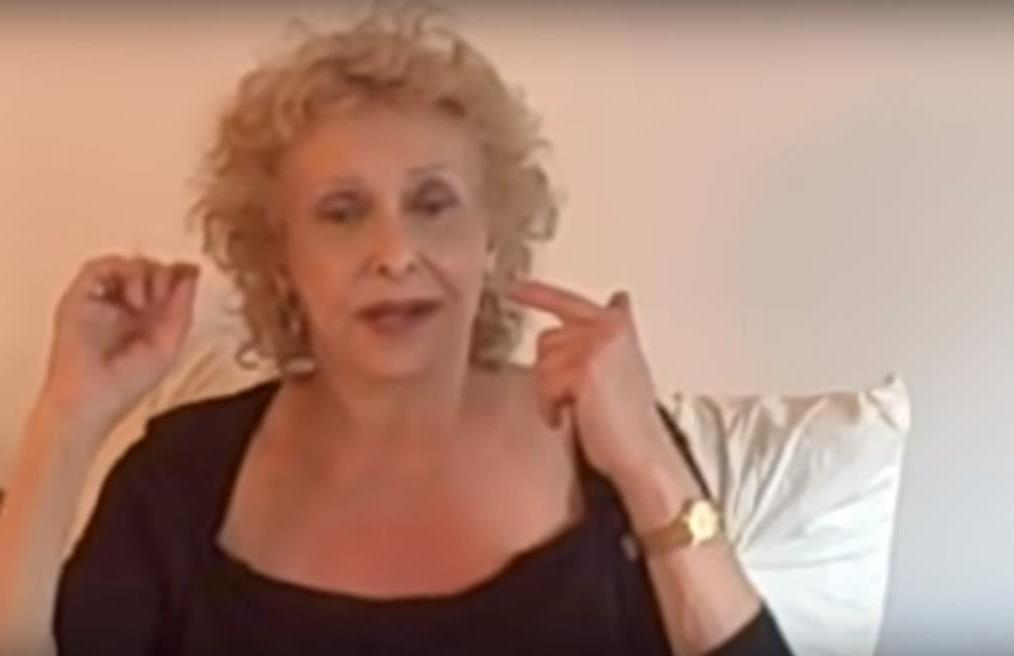
Schneemann in 2008

Schneemann said that in the 1980s her work was sometimes considered by various feminist groups to be an insufficient response to many feminist issues of the time. Her 1994 piece Mortal Coils commemorated 15 friends and colleagues who had died over two years, including Hannah Wilke, John Cage, and Charlotte Moorman. The piece consisted of rotating mechanisms from which hung coiled ropes while slides of the commemorated artists were shown on the walls.

From 1981 to 1988, Schneemann's piece Infinity Kisses was displayed at the San Francisco Museum of Modern Art. The wall installation, consisting of 140 self-shot images, depicted Schneemann kissing her cat at various angles.

In December 2001, she unveiled Terminal Velocity, which consisted of a group of photographs of people falling to their deaths from the World Trade Center during the September 11, 2001 attacks. In this and another of Schneemann's works that used the same images, Dark Pond, Schneemann sought to "personalize" the attacks' victims by digitally enhancing and enlarging the figures in the images, isolating them from their surroundings.

Schneemann continued to produce art later in life, including the 2007 installation Devour, which featured videos of recent wars contrasted with everyday images of United States daily life on dual screens.

She was interviewed for the 2010 film !Women Art Revolution.

=== 2010s−2020s ===
In 2020, Schneemann's work was included in a major group show at the Pérez Art Museum Miami, Florida. My Body, My Rules investigated the artistic practices of 23 female-identified artists in the 21st century, including Louise Bourgeois, Ida Applebroog, Cindy Sherman, Lorna Simpson, Ana Mendieta, Wanguechi Mutu, Mickalene Thomas, and Francesca Woodman.

== Personal life ==
While living in London briefly in 1973, Schneemann met light artist Anthony McCall. When she moved back to New York, he followed her there.

Carolee Schneemann was born in 1939 in the Fox Chase neighborhood of Philadelphia to a rural physician and a homemaker. The first woman in her family to attend college, she studied at Bard College but was briefly suspended for "moral turpitude" after painting a nude self-portrait; she subsequently transferred to Columbia University and later earned an MFA from the University of Illinois. In 1955, she met experimental composer James Tenney, with whom she maintained a long-term relationship and marriage that lasted until 1968. Their domestic and sexual life became the subject of her pioneering autobiographical film Fuses (1967), which also featured her beloved cat, Kitch. Schneemann later lived with artist Anthony McCall in New York City during the 1970s and had a subsequent relationship with Bruce McPherson. Throughout her life, she was deeply devoted to her cats—including Kitch, Vesper, and La Niña—viewing them as essential muses and "co-creators" who informed her understanding of space and intimacy. From 1964 until her death in 2019, she resided and worked in an 18th-century stone farmhouse in New Paltz, New York, a property she considered a primary collaborator in her artistic practice.

== Themes ==
One of Schneemann's work's primary focuses was the separation between eroticism and the politics of gender. Her cat Kitch, which was featured in works such as Fuses (1967) and Kitch's Last Meal (1978), was a major figure in her work for almost 20 years. Schneemann used Kitch as an "objective" observer to her and James Tenney's sexual activities, saying that she was unaffected by human mores. One of her later cats, Vesper, was featured in the photographic series Infinity Kisses (1986). In a wall-size collection of 140 photos, Schneemann documented her daily kisses with Vesper and "the artist at life." With numerous works foregrounding the centrality of feline companions in Schneemann's life, scholars now locate her work as significant for new accounts of human-animal relations.

Schneemann listed as an aesthetic influence on herself and James Tenney the poet Charles Olson, especially the collage Maximus at Gloucester but also in general, "in relationship to his concern for deep imagery, sustained metaphor, and also that he had been researching Tenney's ancestors", despite his occasional sexist comments.

=== Painting ===
Schneemann considered her photographic and body pieces based in painting despite appearing otherwise on the surface. She called herself a "painter who has left the canvas to activate actual space and lived time." She cited her studies with painter Paul Brach as teaching her to "understand the stroke as an event in time" and to think of her performers as "colors in three dimensions." Schneemann took the ideas in her figurative abstract paintings of the 1950s, where she cut and destroyed layers of paint from their surfaces, and transferred them to her photographic work Eye Body. Art history professor Kristine Stiles asserts that Schneemann's entire oeuvre is devoted to exploring the concepts of figure-ground, relationality (both through use of her body), and similitude (through the use of cats and trees). Stiles says that the issues of sex and politics in Schneemann's work merely dictate how the art is shaped, rather than the formal concepts found behind it. For example, Schneemann relates the colors and movement featured in Fuses to brush strokes in painting. Her 1976 piece Up to and Including Her Limits, too, invokes the gestural brush strokes of the abstract expressionists with Schneemann swinging from ropes and scribbling with crayons onto a variety of surfaces.

== Feminism and the body ==
Schneemann acknowledged that she was often called a feminist icon and that she is an influential figure to female artists, but noted that she reached out to male artists as well. Though she was noted for being a feminist figure, her works explore issues in art and rely heavily on her broad knowledge of art history. Works such as Eye Body were meant to explore the processes of painting and assemblage, rather than address feminist topics, though they still possess a strong female presence.

In Schneemann's earlier work, she is seen as addressing issues of patriarchal hierarchies in the 1950s American gallery space. She addressed these issues through various performance pieces that sought to create agency for the female body as both sensual and sexual, while simultaneously breaking gallery space taboos against nude performance.

Unlike much other feminist art, Schneemann's revolves around sexual expression and liberation, rather than referring to victimization or repression of women. According to artist and lecturer Johannes Birringer, Schneemann's work resists the "political correctness" of some branches of feminism as well as ideologies that some feminists claim are misogynist, such as psychoanalysis. He also asserts that Schneemann's work is difficult to classify and analyze because it combines constructivist and painterly concepts with her physical body and energy. In her 1976 book Cézanne, She Was A Great Painter, Schneemann wrote that she used nudity to break taboos associated with the kinetic human body and to show that "the life of the body is more variously expressive than a sex-negative society can admit." She also wrote, "In some sense I made a gift of my body to other women; giving our bodies back to ourselves." According to Kristine Stiles, Schneemann read several books exploring the body's relationship with "sexuality, culture, and freedom", such as The Theater and Its Double by Antonin Artaud, The Second Sex by Simone de Beauvoir, and The Sexual Revolution by Wilhelm Reich. These may have influenced her belief that women must represent themselves through writing about their experiences if they wish to gain equality. She preferred her term "art istorical" (without the h), so as to reject the "his" in history.

== Influence ==
Much of Schneemann's work was performance-based, so photographs, video documentation, sketches, and artist's notes are often used to examine her work. It was not until the 1990s that her work began to be recognized as a central part of the contemporary feminist art canon. The first prominent exhibition of her work was the modest 1996 retrospective Up To and Including Her Limits, named for her 1973 work of the same title. It was held at New York City's New Museum of Contemporary Art and organized by senior curator Dan Cameron. Previously, these works were dismissed as narcissism or otherwise overly sexualized forms of expression.

Critic Jan Avgikos wrote in 1997, "Prior to Schneemann, the female body in art was mute and functioned almost exclusively as a mirror of masculine desire." Critics have also noted that the reaction to Schneemann's work has changed since its original performance. Nancy Princenthal notes that modern viewers of Meat Joy are still squeamish about it; however, now the reaction is also due to the biting of raw chicken or to the men hauling women over their shoulders.

Schneemann's work from the late 1950s continues to influence artists such as Matthew Barney and others, especially women artists. Carolee's Magazine, printed by the Artist's Institute in New York City, highlights Schneemann's visual legacy through side-by-side comparisons with newer artists. Schneemann's work on the one side is juxtaposed with a work bearing signs of her visual style on the other. In 2013, Dale Eisinger of Complex ranked Interior Scroll the 15th-best work of performance art in history, writing, "Schneemann is argued to have realigned the gender balance of conceptual and minimal art with her 1975 piece".

Schneeman was an inspiration for the character Maude Lebowski (portrayed by Julianne Moore) in the 1998 film The Big Lebowski.

== Death ==
Carolee Schneemann died at age 79 on March 6, 2019, after suffering from breast cancer for two decades.

== Awards ==
- 1993 John Simon Guggenheim Memorial Foundation Fellowship
- 2003: Eyebeam Residency
- 2011: United States Artists Rockefeller Fellow for Visual Arts
- 2011: The Women's Caucus for Art Lifetime Achievement Award
- 2012: One of that year's Courage Awards for the Arts from Yoko Ono
- 2017: Venice Biennale's Golden Lion Award For Lifetime Achievement
- 2018: Maria Anto & Elsa von Freytag-Lorignhoven Art Prize, Warsaw (Nagroda im. Marii Anto i Elsy von Freytag-Loringhoven), created by artist Zuzanny Janin and awarded by Fundacja Miejsce Sztuki / Place of Art Foundation on 15.12.2018 at Zachęta National Gallery Warsaw.

== Some works ==
- 1962–63: Four ~Fur Cutting Boards
- 1963: Eye Body: 36 Transformative Actions
- 1964: Meat Joy
- 1965: Viet Flakes
- Autobiographical Trilogy
  - 1964-67: Fuses
  - 1968-71: Plumb Line
  - 1973-78: Kitch's Last Meal
- 1972: Blood Work Diary
- 1973-76: Up to and Including Her Limits
- 1975: Interior Scroll
- 1981: Fresh Blood: A Dream Morphology
- 1981-88: Infinity Kisses
- 1983-2006: Souvenir of Lebanon
- 1986: Hand/Heart for Ana Mendieta
- 1986-88: Venus Vectors
- 1987-88: Vesper's Pool
- 1990: Cycladic Imprints
- 1991: Ask the Goddess
- 1994: Mortal Coils
- 1995: Vulva's Morphia
- 2001: More Wrong Things
- 2001: Terminal Velocity
- 2007: Devour
- 2013: Flange 6rpm

== Selected bibliography ==
- Cézanne, She Was A Great Painter (1976)
- More Than Meat Joy: Performance Works and Selected Writings (1979, 1997)
- Early and Recent Work (1983)
- Imaging Her Erotics: Essays, Interviews, Projects (2001)
- Carolee Schneemann: Uncollected Texts (2018)

== In popular culture ==
She is the main subject of the feature-length experimental nonfiction film Breaking the Frame by Canadian director Marielle Nitoslawska (2012).
