= The Plumbline =

The Plumbline is a humor publication of the (MES) of McMaster University. Popular among the students of McMaster Engineering, The Plumbline is famous for publishing everything from obscure engineering memes to informative articles. The Plumbline was started by a group of Engineering students in 1967, developed from a single sheet MES news letter. In 1971, the editors decided to turn the newsletter into an 8-page tabloid format newspaper.

By the early 1990s, it was clear that student and administration acceptance of sexist and xenophobic content was dropped. In this climate, The Plumbline reformatted, dropping any offensive content from its masthead, developing a new form of satirical and parody genres of humor and abandoning misogyny as fodder for comedy.

In October 2012, The Plumbline converted to a digital format, due to declining readerships and large print costs.

Some public opinion of the early 2010's was shared that the McMaster Engineering community felt that the Plumbline was unfairly targeted by the remainder of the campus for its controversial content and potentially offensive subject matter, and that it was subjected to a harsher, more restrictive standard than other on-campus events (such as the misogynistic lyrics of Choclair who performed on campus) and publications organized by other groups (like the campus wide newspaper The Silhouette).

As of 2022, the Plumbline releases 2 print editions per semester which are reviewed by the MES editorial committee prior to distribution. These journals are handed out to students at no cost from the MES student run store, 'The Drain'. The Plumbline of today consistently features meme submissions from students, bingo cards for SAGM (the MES Semi-annual general meeting), opinion pieces, horoscopes, and hilarious articles promoting upcoming events and holidays. The Plumbline editorial team aims to foster community and humour inclusive of all students in the faculty.

Although The Plumbline is a publication of the MES, the material contained within it is not in any way affiliated with McMaster University, and does not express views or opinions shared by all, if any, students at the university.

== Origins ==
Larry Ireland was the first editor-in-chief of The Plumbline (section), which got its name in an MES contest in the spring of 1967. Previously the MES newsletter was a one-page bi-monthly publication, which became the first Plumbline issue in April 1967 (volume 4 Nos 1 to 12). Don Mros created the cartoon character of Superplumber, who battled 'artsies' and other 'low-lifes'.

With help of Dean Hodgins office staff, the Plumbline put out a 4-page bi-weekly paper, which started with circulation of roughly 400 copies but grew to more than a thousand (total enrolment in all years & grads of Engineering = less than 700). The Plumbline became the most widely read newsletter on campus, especially in the women's residences. Limited by the technology of the day, the first issues used mimeograph and gestetner printing.

== Content ==
- Engitorials: Similar to a regular editorial, written by the Plumbline editors.
- Shines and Moon: A thumbs up, thumbs down section where events and/or people are given approval or disapproval.
- Shindigs and Hoedowns: A report or review of current events within the Engineering Society.
- Onions and Opinions: A section similar to regular newspapers where readers can submit opinions and complaints.
- News Briefs: Humorous news clips, most often fictional and absurd.
- Nuts and Bolt: Various games and activities such as crosswords and connect-the-dots.
- Plumboscopes: A humorous horoscope written by a Plumbline 'astrologer'.
- Arts Matter: A section devoted to numerous comic strips, including those drawn by contributors.
- Shafts and Gears: Page containing 'nerdy' or 'mechanical' jokes, usually niche and/or technically obscure.

The Plumbline also contains featured articles, usually pertaining to current events around McMaster and Engineering, as well as pictures and clips submitted by readers. The Plumbline is heavily dependent on reader-submitted content.

== 2005 Controversy ==
In late 2005, publication of The Plumbline was temporarily suspended because of allegations from the McMaster Coalition for Equitable Social Change that the paper promoted hate-speech and sexist attitudes. The Coalition saw the newspaper as a key element in a larger problem of intolerance within the faculty of Engineering. They argued that this is evident in many of the faculty's traditions and "welcome" practices for first year students. According to them, the newspaper legitimized this culture of intolerance. On the other hand, advocates of The Plumbline argued that the depictions were wholly satirical in nature and protected under free speech. Some argue that the opposition was a form of moral panic in response to the rape of a McMaster student within the Engineering faculty and the efforts to minimize the rape and subsequent conviction of Engineering student for the crime.

After a brief period of debates and arguments including review by the Executive of the McMaster Engineering Society, the Dean of Engineering, and the Human Rights Office, The Plumbline returned to shelves. There were a number of changes suggested to the content and a series of sensitivity training sessions took effect. Currently both online and hard-copy versions of the newspaper are available and reviewed by the MES equity and inclusion officer prior to printing.

== Current status ==
- Volume 53
- Review board of 11 engineering students, including the Publications chair, Equity and Inclusion Officer and Editorial Review Committee

== Recent Editors ==
- 2026-2027: Ayesha Basu and Yan Epstein
- 2022-2023: Ayesha Basu and Miguel Sibal
- 2021-2022: Emily Nobes and Zach Thorne
- 2020-2021: Alexi Buenaventura & Angela Huang
- 2018-2019: MJ Lindsay and Jackson Tarlin
- 2017-2018: Vicky Duarte and Andy Fan
- 2016-2017: Pooja Srikanth and Max Guan
- 2015-2016: Tyson Collins and Neil MacPhee
- 2014-2015: Marko Maric and Neil MacPhee
- 2013-2014: Steph Elder, Martin Bellamy
- 2012-2013: Zachary Strong
- 2011-2012: Zachary Strong, Jaime Maitland
- 2010-2011: Justin Panus, Danielle Maitland
- 2009 November - 2010: Danielle Maitland, Justin Panus, Niel Van Engelen
- 2009 April - October: Allan Kean
- 2008-2009: Justin Sma, Jon Huber
- 2008 January - March: Josh Campbell, Justin Sma
- 2007 April - December: Josh Campbell, Kevin Tanaka
- 2006-2007: James Spackman, James Morris
- 2005-2006: Ashkan Eshaghbeigi, Mike Everson
- 2004-2005: Emery Finkelstein, Cam Farrell
- 2004: Jackson Wiegman, Andrew Tataj (two issues)
- 2003-2004: Peter Kostanski, Andrew Tataj
- 2002-2003: Matthew Bigness, Chris Ness
- 2001-2002: Andrew Hill
- 2000-2001: Cam Hodgkins
- 1999-2000: Cam Hodgkins
- 1998-1999: Duncan Forster
