= Mikhail Stepanov =

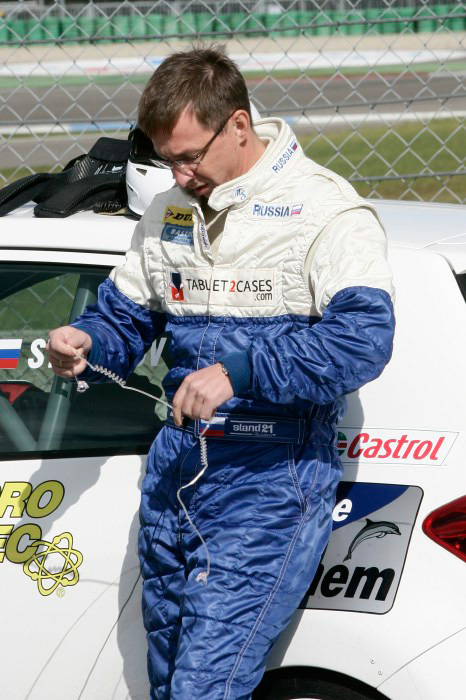
- Stepanov in 2011
- Nationality: (Russia) Russian
- Born: Mikhail Vladimirovich Stepanov; 29 June 1968 (age 58) Moscow (Soviet Union)

Russian Racing Championship career
- Debut season: 2003

Previous series
- 2010–11: ADAC Procar Series

Championship titles
- 2006: 2nd Place Russian Touring Car Championship (Touring Light)

Mikhail Vladimirovich Stepanov (Russian: Михаи́л Владимирович Степа́нов, IPA: [mʲɪxɐˈil ˈurʲɪvʲɪtɕ sʲtʲɪˈpanəf]; born 29 June 1968) is a Russian auto racing driver. He is married and has five children.

== Racing career ==
Stepanov, a mathematician, began his racing career in 2003 in Russian Touring Car Racing. Stepanov began to slowly establish a name for himself with his daredevil flawless style of driving resulting in very few collisions. At the Russian Touring Car Championship of 2006, Michail Stepanov finished second in class 'Touring Light'.

In 2010 Stepanov began racing for the Yaco Racing Team behind the wheel of a Toyota Auris S2000 in the Division 1 German ADAC Procar Series. After 13 race participations during the 2010 ADAC Procar Series season, Michael Stepanov had earned 29 points and finished the year in 9th overall position.

The 2011 ADAC Procar Series season has been Michail Stepanov's best year yet, with a steadily growing international fanbase and a number of new sponsorship deals outside the racetrack. At the second race of the 2011 racing season at the Oschersleben racetrack, Stepanov took 2nd place. After 13 race participations during the season, Michail Stepanov had achieved 4 podiums and earned a total of 58 points. He took 5th overall position in the 1st division ADAC Procar Series.

In 2012 Stepanov returned to Russia, and joined a championship which was renamed into the Russian Racing Championship (RRC), after Russian Automobile Federation united all Russian circuit racing classes under the framework of one championship. The new RRC includes 8 races, which take place from May to September on various circuits.

Stepanov joined the B-tuning team to race in Seat Leon Supercopa in the most prestigious category – Touring. He produced some quality racing during the 2012 season including a second place during the 4th race of the season, which earned him 5th place in the overall classification with 801 points. During the 2012 season Stepanov scooped one victory in the SEAT Super Copa classification, and has also managed a couple of podium finishes in this separate classification, which allowed him to take 3rd place at the end of the season. His team, B-tuning has ended up in third spot in overall classification at the end of 2012 season.

Stepanov remained a B-tuning team driver for the 2013 season and was off to a great start setting a course record during practice and qualifying in 4th place for the race. He climbed up the ranks in the first race ending up in 2nd spot. Stepanov also managed to place on top of the podium in SEAT Super Copa classification in both races of the day.

The second race of 2013 season was held on Moscow Raceway on June 7–9. For the first time in Russian racing history, the RRC stage was combined with WTCC racing weekend. Stepanov qualified in 8th place for the first race of the stage, but went on to climb up to 6th place in the race. He then started the second race in pole position, but ended up in 4th spot at the end of the second race. Nonetheless, the weekend has allowed him to collect valuable points for both Driver and Team season classifications.

Stage 3 was held on Smolensk Ring on between 28 June and 30. After poor qualification in 8th place, Stepanov rose to the occasion and finished the 1st race of the weekend in 4th place. During the second race he managed to keep the 4th position, thus gathering important points for both his B-tuning team and individual classification. Stepanov also managed to win both races in separate Seat Super Copa classification, further solidifying his lead in the overall standings.

The fourth stage tool place on Kazanring on the July 12–14 weekend. Stepanov managed to qualify in 5th place, but can only manage an 11th position in the first race. The second race of the weekend went a little bit better for Stepanov as he climbed to 4th place at one point, but in the end finished in 8th position. Nonetheless, even these poor results allowed him to collect points for both Driver's and Constructor's classifications and keep him and his B-tuning team in contention for high places. The only positive note of the weekend were the two podium finishes in the Seat Super Copa classification, keeping him en route for the season victory.

== Racing record ==
=== Career summary ===
Season	Series	Team	Races	Wins	Poles	F/Laps	Podiums	Points	Position
2010	ADAC Procar Series	Yaco Racing	13	0	0	0	0	29	9th
2011	ADAC Procar Series	Yaco Racing	13	0	0	0	4	58	5th
2012	Russian Racing Championship	B-tuning	8	0	0	0	1	801	5th
