= Sabine Breitwieser =

Austrian curator and art manager

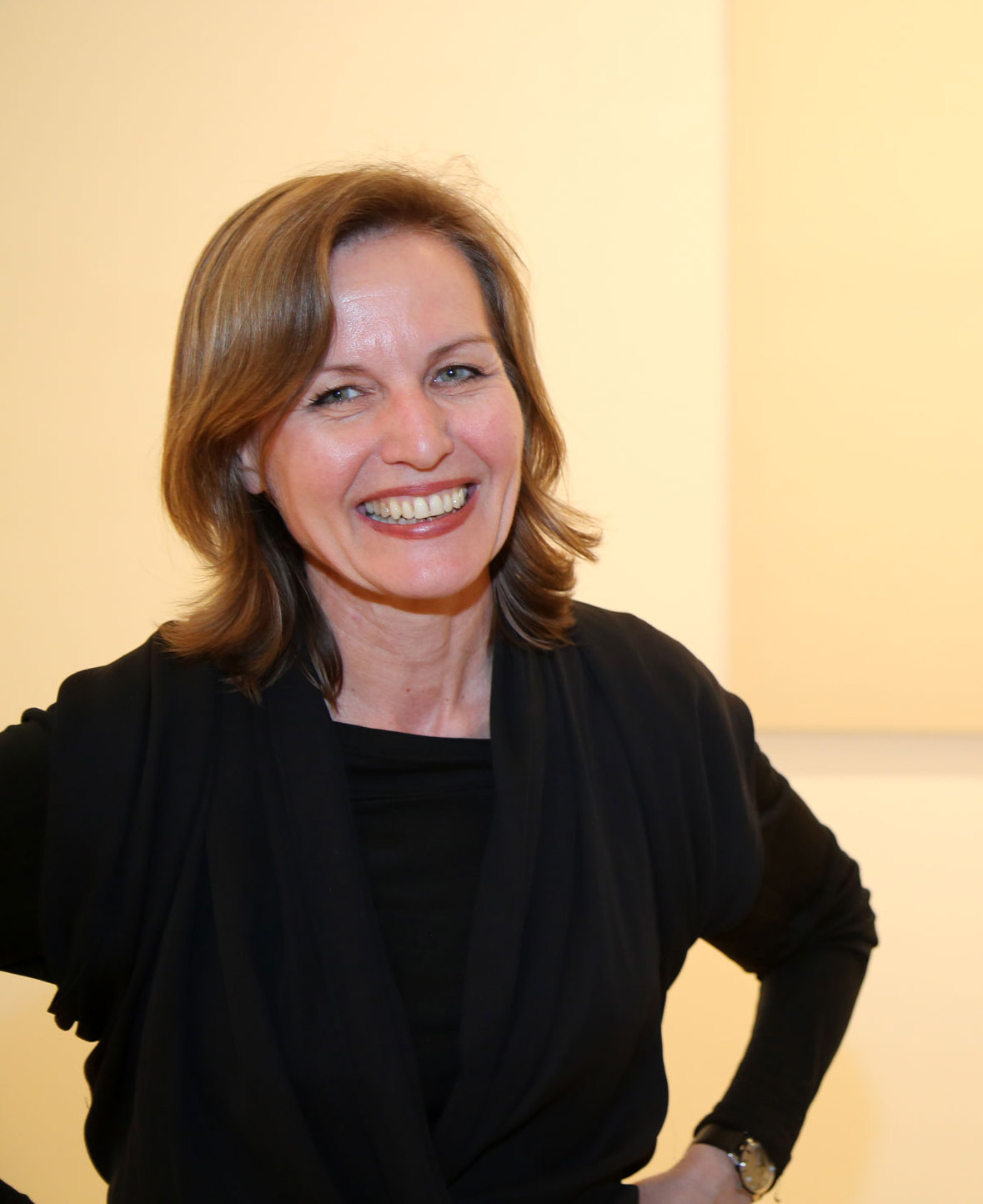
- Sabine Breitwieser (2015)
- Born: April 6, 1962; Wels, Austria
- Occupations: Austrian curator, art manager and publicist

Sabine Breitwieser (born April 6, 1962, in Wels, Austria) is an Austrian curator, art manager and publicist.

== Life ==
After studying law in Linz, Breitwieser obtained her doctorate in law at the University of Vienna. She was initially coordinator and curator in 1988 and from 1991 to 2007 the first artistic director on the board of the Generali Foundation (founding director). In developing the initial plans for a collection of Austrian sculpture, she expanded the Generali Foundation's art collection with a focus on conceptual and critical art. This collection, as well as the exhibitions it has shown, have met with international acclaim.

In 2003 and 2004 she was one of the curators of the International Liverpool Biennial, and from 2003 to 2008 she was a member of the University Council of the Academy of Fine Arts Vienna. In 2007, Breitwieser became Secretary and Treasurer of CIMAM (International Committee for Museums and Collections of Modern Art).

She was appointed the chief curator of media and performance art at MoMA in Manhattan in May 2010, holding the role until 2013. In the same year she completed the second part of her two-year project Utopia and Monument for the Styrian Autumn, which she had begun the previous year. From 2013 to 2018, she was the director of the Museum der Moderne Salzburg (MdMS). In 2014, as part of her work as director, she agreed to a partnership with Generali and the relocation of the collection she had built up from Vienna to MdMS. Breitwieser also works as a freelance curator, lecturer and author on contemporary art.

She co-organized a show on German sculptor Isa Genzken in 2013, the first "comprehensive Genzken exhibition in an American museum." In 2015, she organized "Carole Schneemann: Kinetic Painting" for the Museum der Moderne Salzburg, which traveled to MoMA PS1 in 2017 and 2018. In 2019 and 2020, she curated a show at the Muzeum Susch about Carolee Schneeman.

== Awards ==
- 2012 Yoko Ono Lennon Courage Award for the Arts

== Exhibitions (selection) ==
=== MdMS - Museum der Moderne Salzburg ===
- 2018 Anna Boghiguian
- 2018 Marisa Merz – Der Himmel ist ein weiter Raum
- 2018 30 Jahre Generali Foundation
- 2017 Neues Salzburg
- 2017 Folklore
- 2017 William Kentridge. Thick Time
- 2017 Foto Kinetik
- 2016 Pichler. Radikal
- 2016 Raymond Pettibon
- 2016 Räume schaffen. Aus den Sammlungen
- 2016 Anti:modern. Salzburg in mitten von Europa zwischen Tradition und Erneuerung
- 2016 Kunst-Musik-Tanz. Staging the Derra de Moroda Dance Archives
- 2015 Carolee Schneemann. Kinetische Malerei
- 2015 E.A.T. Experiments in Arts and Technology
- 2015 Wirkliches Leben? Ein Panorama der Sammlungen
- 2015 Andrea Fraser
- 2014 Isa Genzken. Neue Werke
- 2014 Proudly Presenting. Sammlung Generali Foundation
- 2014 Simone Forti. Mit dem Körper denken
- 2014 Kunst/Geschichten
- 2014 Ana Mendieta. Traces

=== MoMA – The Museum of Modern Art, New York ===
- 2013 Isaac Julien. Ten Thousand Waves
- 2013 Isa Genzken. Retrospective
- 2012 Christian Marclay. The Clock
- 2012 Performing Histories
- 2012 MoMA Media Lounge mit Renée Green
- 2012 Words in the world
- 2012 9 Scripts from a Nation at War
- 2011 Combatant Status Review Tribunals
- 2011 Harun Farocki: Images of War (at a Distance)
- 2011 Grand Openings

=== Generali Foundation ===
- 2007 Sammlung
- 2007 Exil des Imaginären
- 2006 Und so hat Konzept noch nie Pferd bedeutet
- 2006 Edward Krasinski. Les mises en scène
- 2006 Kino wie noch nie
- 2005 Wie Gesellschaft und Politik ins Bild kommen
- 2005 Gustav Metzger. Geschichte Geschichte
- 2005 Das Neue Europa
- 2004 Collected views from east or west
- 2004 Theresa Hak Kyung Cha: The Dream of the Audience
- 2004 Dass die Körper sprechen, auch das wissen wir seit langem
- 2003 Sammlung
- 2003 Allan Sekula
- 2003 Geografie und die Politik der Mobilität
- 2002 Designs für die wirkliche Welt
- 2002 Adrian Piper. seit 1965
- 2002 Die Gewalt ist der Rand aller Dinge
- 2001 Hans Haacke. Mia san mia
- 2001 doublelife
- 2000 vivencias / Lebenserfahrung
- 2000 Re-Play. Anfänge internationaler Medienkunst in Österreich
- 2000 Dinge, die wir nicht verstehen

=== Other institutions ===
- 2020 Up to and Including Limits: After Carolee Schneemann, Muzeum Susch
- 2017 Carolee Schneemann. Kinetic Painting, MoMA PS1, Long Island City
- 2017 Carolee Schneemann. Kinetische Malerei, MMK Museum für Moderne Kunst, Frankfurt
- 2015 Isa Genzken. Neue Werke, MMK Museum für Moderne Kunst, Frankfurt
- 2014 Isa Genzken. Retrospective, Dallas Museum of Art
- 2014 Isa Genzken. Retrospective, MCA Museum of Contemporary Art, Chicago
- 2010 Utopie und Monument II, steirischer herbst
- 2010 Modernologies, MUZEUM | Museum of Modern Art in Warsaw
- 2009 Modernologies – Contemporary artists researching modernity and modernism; Museu d'Art Contemporani, Barcelona
- 2009 Which life? Between Calling and Career; Akademie der bildenden Künste Wien
- 2009 Utopie und Monument I, steirischer herbst
- 2007 For a special place, Austrian Cultural Forum, New York
- 2005 Occupying Space, Haus der Kunst, München; Museum of Contemporary Art, Zagreb
- 2003 Adrian Piper, MACBA Barcelona
- 2003 Adrian Piper – Depuis 1965, Institut d´art contemporain / Frac Rhône-Alpes, Villeurbanne

== Publications ==
- Marisa Merz. Il cielo è grande spazio / Der Himmel ist ein weiter Raum. Dt. Ausgabe, Salzburg: Museum der Moderne Salzburg, 2018. ISBN 978-3-200-05660-2
- William Kentridge. Thick Time. by Iwona Blazwick and Sabine Breitwieser. London: Whitechapel/Salzburg: Museum der Moderne Salzburg, 2016. ISBN 978-0-85488-250-2
- Anti:modern. Salzburg inmitten von Europa zwischen Tradition und Erneuerung. Dt./Engl., Salzburg: Museum der Moderne Salzburg/München: Hirmer, 2016. ISBN 978-3-7774-2696-9
- Carolee Schneemann. Kinetic Painting. Salzburg: Museum der Moderne Salzburg/München: Prestel, 2015. ISBN 978-3-7913-5508-5
- E.A.T. – Experiments in Art and Technology. Dt./Engl., Salzburg: Museum der Moderne Salzburg/Köln: Walther König, 2015. ISBN 978-3-86335-783-2
- Andrea Fraser. Salzburg: Museum der Moderne Salzburg/Ostfildern: Hatje-Cantz, 2015. ISBN 978-3-7757-4015-9
- Kunst/Geschichten / Art/Histories. Dt./Engl., Salzburg: Museum der Moderne Salzburg/München: Hirmer, 2014. ISBN 978-3-7774-2279-4
- Simone Forti. Thinking with the Body. Salzburg: Museum der Moderne Salzburg/München: Hirmer, 2014. ISBN 978-3-7774-2278-7
- Ana Mendieta. Traces. Dt. und Engl. Ausgabe. Salzburg: Museum der Moderne Salzburg/Ostfildern: Hatje-Cantz, 2014. ISBN 978-3-7757-3764-7
- Isa Genzken. Retrospective. Engl., New York: The Museum of Modern Art, 2013. ISBN 978-0-87070-886-2
- Utopia and Monument. Graz: steirischer herbst/Wien-New York: Springer Verlag, 2010. ISBN 978-3-7091-0772-0
- Modernologies. Contemporary Artists Researching Modernity and Modernism. Barcelona: MACBA/Actar, 2009. ISBN 978-84-92505-13-5
- Ausstellungen. Generali Foundation. Exhibitions 1989–2007. Dt./Engl., Wien: Generali Foundation/Köln: Walther König, 2008. ISBN 978-3-901107-54-2
- Edward Krasinski. Les mises en scène. Dt./Engl., Wien: Generali Foundation/Köln: Walther König, 2006. ISBN 3-901107-49-5
- Gustav Metzger. History History. Wien: Generali Foundation/Ostfildern: Hatje-Cantz, 2005. ISBN 3-901107-47-9
- Occupying Space. Sammlung Generali Foundation Collection. Dt./Engl., Wien: Generali Foundation/Köln: Walther König, 2003. ISBN 3-901107-42-8
- Allan Sekula. Performance under Working Conditions. Dt./Engl., Wien: Generali Foundation/Ostfildern: Hatje Cantz, 2003. ISBN 3-901107-39-8
- Adrian Piper. seit 1965. Metakunst und Kunstkritik. Dt., Wien: Generali Foundation/Köln: Walther König, 2002. ISBN 3-901107-36-3
- Mia san mia. Hans Haacke. Dt./Engl., Wien: Generali Foundation/Dresden: Philo Verlag der Kunst, 2001. ISBN 3-364-00392-0
- double life. Identität und Transformation in der zeitgenössischen Kunst / Identity und Transformation in Contemporary Arts. Dt./Engl., Wien: Generali Foundation/Köln: Walther König, 2001. ISBN 3-901107-28-2
- vivências / Lebenserfahrung / life experience. Dt./Engl., Wien: Generali Foundation/Köln: Walther König, 2000. ISBN 3-901107-28-2
- RE-PLAY. Anfänge internationaler Medienkunst in Österreich / Beginnings of international Media Art in Austria. Dt./Engl., ISBN 3-901107-27-4
- Martha Rosler. Positionen in der Lebenswelt. Dt., Wien: Generali Foundation/Köln: Walther König, 1999. ISBN 3-901107-23-1
- Mary Kelly. Post-Partum Dokument. Dt. Ausgabe, Wien: Generali Foundation/ München: Verlag Silke Schreiber und Wien: Generali Foundation/Los Angeles: University of California Press, 1999.
- Mary Kelly. Rereading Post-Partum Document. Dt./Engl., Wien: Generali Foundation, 1999. ISBN 3-901107-25-8
- Pichler. Prototypen 1966–69. Dt./Engl., Wien: Generali Foundation/Salzburg: Residenz Verlag, 1998. ISBN 3-7017-1146-1
- Reorganizing Structure by Drawing Through It. Zeichnung bei Gordon Matta-Clark. Dt./Engl., Wien: Generali Foundation/Köln: Walther König, 1997. ISBN 3-901107-18-5
- White Cube/Black Box. Dt./Engl., Wien: Generali Foundation/Köln: Walther König, 1996. ISBN 3-901107-14-2
- Andrea Fraser. Report: EA-Generali Foundation, Wien: Generali Foundation, 1994. ISBN 3-901107-12-6
