= Matthias Kaul =

German musician (1949–2020)

- Born: January 29, 1949; Hamburg, West Germany
- Died: July 1, 2020 (aged 71)
- Education: Hochschule für Musik und Theater Hamburg
- Occupations: percussionist composer
- Spouse: Astrid Schmeling

Matthias Kaul (29 January 1949 – 1 July 2020) was a German percussionist and composer of classical music.

== Life and career ==
Born in Hamburg, West Germany, Matthias Kaul studied percussion at the Hochschule für Musik und Theater Hamburg and for five years was a member of the ensemble Hinz & Kunst in Hamburg. He performed as a guest musician with several orchestras of Northern Germany. From 1977 until 1980 he traveled through Africa in order to study the traditional music of the Xhosa, Samburu and Maasai tribes. In 1983 he founded the ensemble l'art pour l'art. In 1990, Matthias Kaul with the American violinist Malcolm Goldstein began performing in an improvisational duo. Matthias Kaul’s work comprises more than 100 compositions including chamber music, choral music, audio drama and opera. Since 1987, he has performed as a percussionist and glass harmonica player in various radio recordings and on festivals. Recordings of his work were published alongside those of Alvin Lucier, John Cage, Vinko Globokar and Christian Wolff. Mathias Kaul invented numerous musical instruments such as the “Matthias Kaul overtone drum” and the overtone triangle. With his wife, the flautist Astrid Schmeling, he taught a yearly composition master class for children since 1999.

== Awards and recognition ==
- German "Echo Klassik" Award for "Haltbar gemacht" in the category "Classical music for children" (2012)
- "Deutscher Schallplattenpreis" for "Haltbar gemacht" (2012)
- "Junge Ohren Award" for his composition master class for children in Winsen (2011)
- Advancement award music education for his composition master class for children in Winsen (2009)
- Nomination for the German Record Critics' Award for „Bread and Roses" (2003), "Toucher" (2004) and "Cover Versions" (2007)

== Works ==
=== Chamber music (selection) ===
- Concerto for panorama horn and ensemble (2015)
- Recycling – for 5 percussionists (2012)
- Stuff from Above – for 4 percussionists (2011)
- Wheeled – for 5 percussionists with 5 bicycles (2010)
- Bell Air – for 6 percussionists with 36 bells (2010)
- Töne – for 6 players with 18 flowerpots (2009)
- Salty – for accordion, double bass and playback (2008)
- fremd, bestimmt – for 6 vocalists with voicespeakers (2008)
- Some Changes – for voice, flute, guitar and percussion (2007)
- Delikatessen – for 3 players in a wurst shack (2006)
- Silence Is my Voice – for voice with voicespeaker playback (2005)
- Kafkas Heidelbeeren - Imaginäres Vokal- und Instrumentaltheater (2005)
- Listen this is for You, Kona – for percussion and feedbackbottle (2004)

=== Opera ===
- Relax
- Kafkas Heidelbeeren
- Electric Bath – für einen Performer

=== Opera for children ===
- Kuckuck im Koffer
- Die Menschenfresserin
- Oliver Twist (2004)

=== Audio drama ===
- My Snare Drum gently weeps (2017)
- Fake Dimensions (2013)
- Umbauter Raum (2013)
- Schrammen (2011)
- Audible Edibles (2009)
- Some Rooms in my room (2006)
- Electric Bath – für einen badenden Schlagzeuger (2003–2004)
- Das Buch der schönen Stimmen with E. Bohde (1997)
- Fuge mit einigen Freiheiten with E. Bohde (1996)
- Undine geht with E. Bohde (1994)

== Discography ==
- John Cage – Variations II, Eight Whiskus, Music for Two Ryoanji (Matthias Kaul: Percussion, Glas Harmonica); WERGO
- Christian Wolff – Bread and Roses (Matthias Kaul: Percussion, Voice, Wheel Fiddle); WERGO
- Alvin Lucier – Nothing is Real (Matthias Kaul: Percussion, Voice, Piano); WERGO
- Vinko Globokar – Toucher (Matthias Kaul: Percussion and Voice); WERGO
- John Cage – Cage after Cage (Matthias Kaul: Percussion); WERGO
