= Live Art Development Agency =

The Live Art Development Agency (LADA)
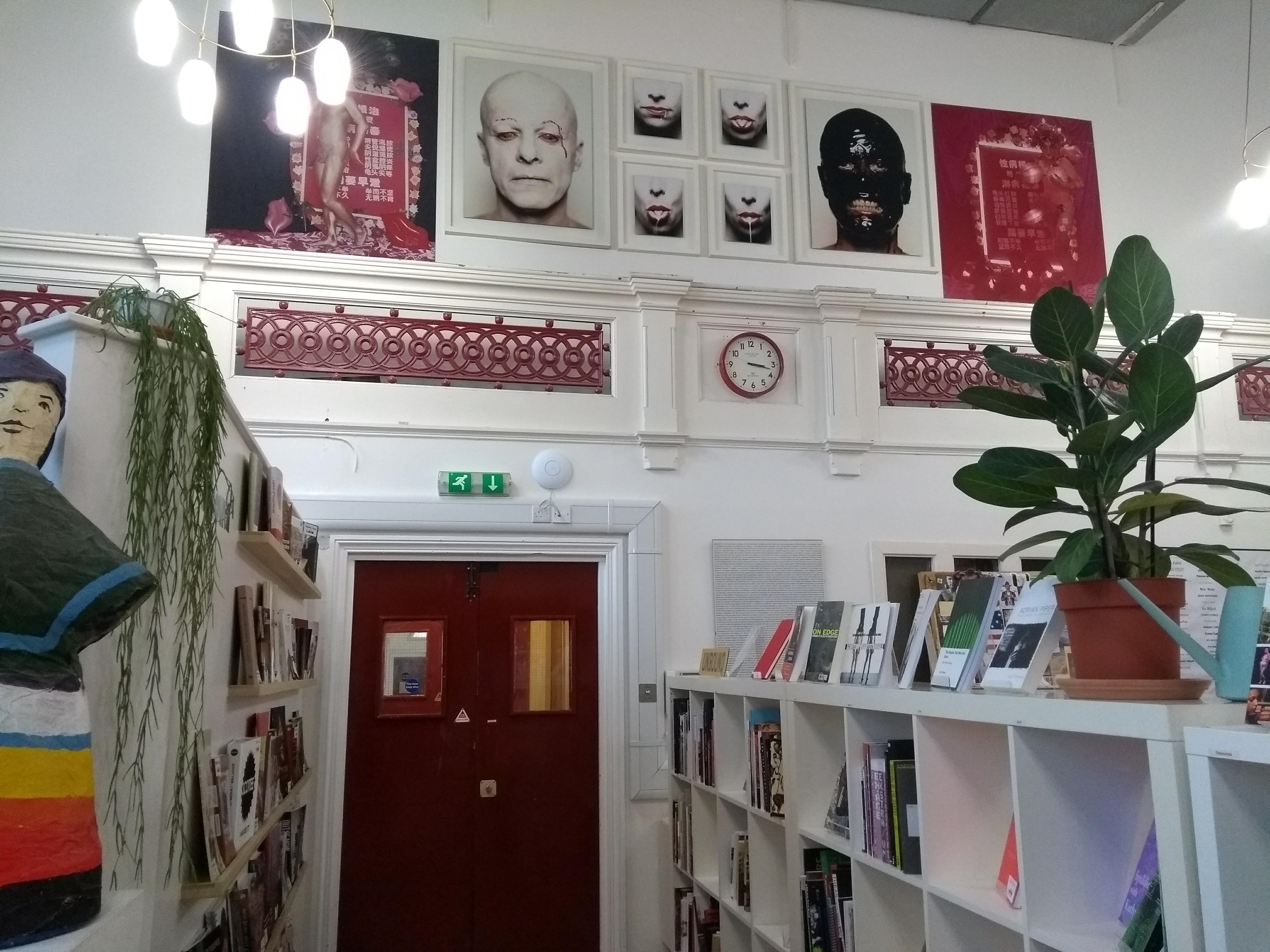
- Formation: 1999; 27 years ago
- Purpose: promoting Live Art, supporting artists
- Location(s): The Garrett Centre 117A Mansford Street London
- Key people: Lois Keidan, Director and co-founder
- Website: www.thisisliveart.co.uk

Live Art Development Agency, known by its acronym LADA, is an arts organisation and registered charity based in East London which supports Live Art practices and advocates for Live Art as a politicised approach to art-making. In 2015, LADA became a National Portfolio Organisation.

== History ==
LADA was founded in 1999 by Lois Keidan and Catherine Ugwu. Keidan and Ugwu were previously running the Live Art programme of the Institute of Contemporary Arts and supported Live Art activity in London at the time. In the following decades, LADA produced programmes and seminal publications, and provided support to artists.

In 2020, Lois Keidan accelerated her plan to step aside as Director amid calls for racial justice and equity in the sector and in 2021 artists Barak adé Soleil and Chinasa Vivian Ezugha were appointed as co-directors following an international recruitment process. In 2023, a period of organisational instability led to LADA's suspension from Arts Council England's National Portfolio. A new Board of Trustees was appointed, along with interim director Ria Righteous. In 2024, Mary Osborn was appointed as LADA's new director.

== Activities ==
LADA has been producing events, opportunities, resources and publications.

It hosts the Live Art Research Collection, the world’s largest collection of research materials on Live Art, with over 8,000 items ranging from theoretical texts to DVDs, videos, CDs and digital files of performance documents and documentation. It was described by The Independent as one of the UK's 50 best museums and galleries.

LADA is responsible for funding and co-ordinating Live Art UK, a national network of organisations and venues that support and develop Live Art infrastructures.

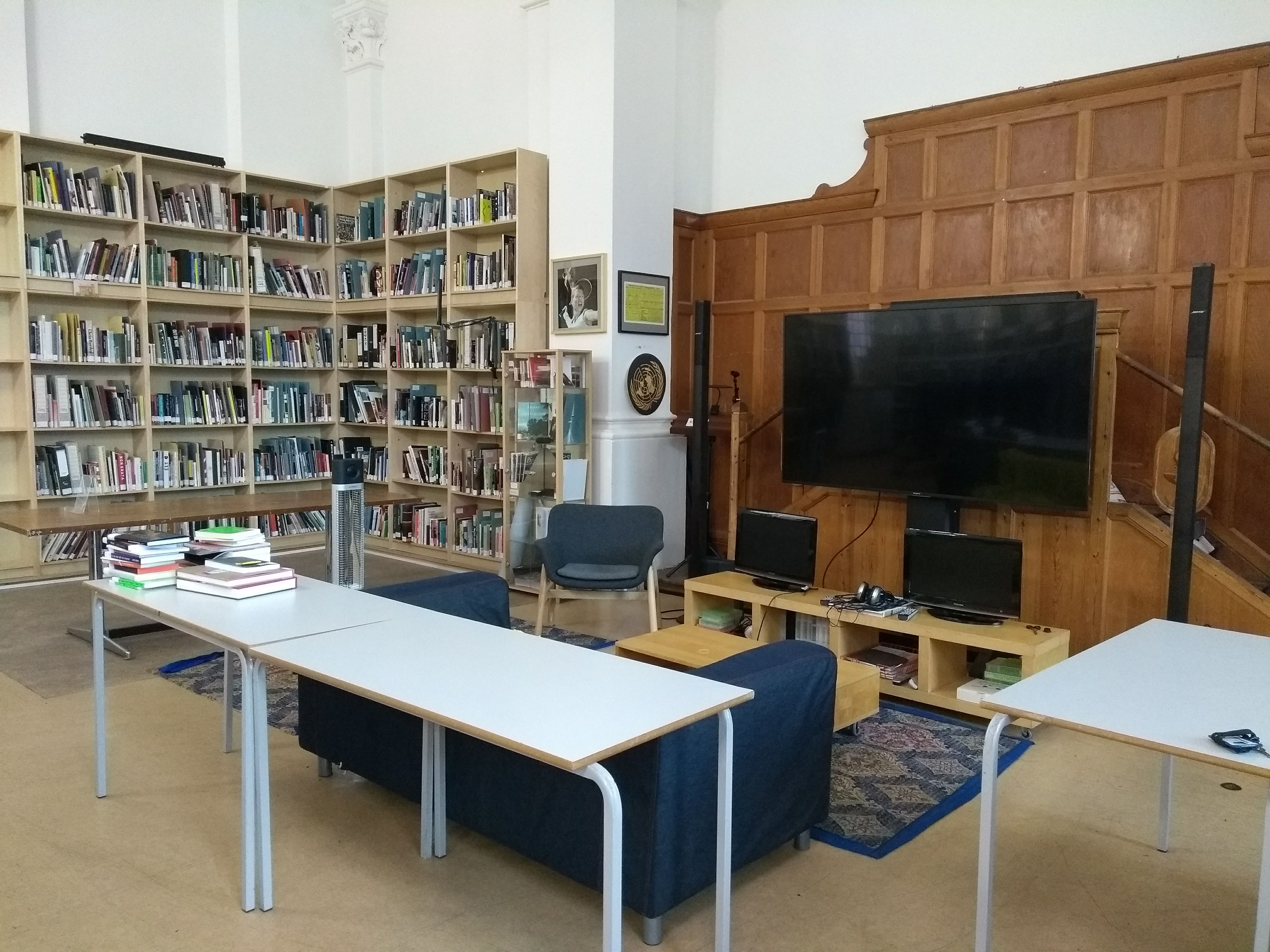

== Selected Projects ==
- Live Culture (2003), event at Tate Modern which included performances from Franko B, Forced Entertainment, La Pocha Nostra and a lecture by Marina Abramović.
- Restock, Rethink, Reflect (2006-2021), a series of initiatives for and about artists whose work engages with issues of identity politics and cultural diversity.
- Performing Rights (2006-2014), a programme of events relating to the intersections of performance and human rights.
- Performance Matters (2009-2012), AHRC-funded research project considering the cultural value of Live Art.
- Access All Areas (2011), a two-day public programme reflecting the ways in which artists who work with Live Art have engaged with, represented, and problematised issues of disability.
- Diverse Actions Leadership Bursaries (2017-2019), an initiative supporting a new generation of leaders from culturally diverse backgrounds.
- The Katherine Araniello Bursary Awards (2020), for early career artists who work in Live Art and identify as disabled, established to honour the legacy of Katherine Araniello.

== Publications ==
LADA has published and co-published a number of titles relating to Live Art:

- Exposures (2002), edited by Manuel Vason, Lois Keidan, and Ron Athey, published by Black Dog Publishing in association with LADA.
- Perform Repeat Record (2012), edited by Adrian Heathfield and Amelia Jones, co-published with Intellect.
- Throwing the Body into the Fight: A Portrait of Raimund Hoghe (2013), edited by Mary Kate Connolly, co-published with Intellect.
- Out of Now: The Lifeworks of Tehching Hsieh (2015), edited by Adrian Heathfield, co-published with MIT Press.
- Pleading in the Blood: The Art and Performances of Ron Athey (2015), edited by Dominic Johnson, co-published with Intellect.
- It's All Allowed: The Performances of Adrian Howells (2016), edited by Deirdre Heddon and Dominic Johnson, co-published with Intellect.
- The Only Way Home Is Through the Show: Performance Work of Lois Weaver (2016), edited by Lois Weaver and Jen Harvie, co-published with Intellect.
- Kira O'Reilly: Untitled (Bodies) (2018), edited by Harriet Curtis and Martin Hargreaves, co-published with Intellect.
- Anne Bean: Self Etc (2019) edited by Rob La Frenais.
- Joshua Sofaer: Performance | Objects | Participation (2020), edited by Roberta Mock and Mary Paterson, co-published with Intellect.
- The Live Art Almanacs, Volumes 1-6, international collections of ‘found writing’ about and around Live Art.

== Patrons ==
LADA has a board of Patrons composed of established artists who have contributed significantly to the development of Live Art. They are: Marina Abramović, Ron Athey, Neil Bartlett, Anne Bean, Sonia Boyce, Tim Etchells, Guillermo Gómez-Peña, Tehching Hsieh, Isaac Julien, La Ribot, Lois Weaver.

LADA's initial list of patrons included the artist Raimund Hoghe, who died in 2021.

== Key reading ==
- Live Art Development Agency and Live Art UK, eds. 2010. In Time: A Collection of Live Art Case Studies. London: Live Art Development Agency.
- Schmidt, Theron, ed. 2019. AGENCY: A Partial History of Live Art. Bristol: Intellect Books.
- Chatzichristodoulou, Maria, ed. 2020. Live Art in the UK: Contemporary Performances of Precarity. London: Methuen Drama.
