= Nicholas Sinclair (disambiguation) =

Nicholas Sinclair is a photographer.

Nicholas or Nick Sinclair may also refer to:

- Nicholas Sinclair (swimmer), represented Canada at the 2010 Pan Pacific Swimming Championships
- Nicholas Sinclair, character in A.P.E.X.
- Nick Sinclair, photographer
- Nick Sinclair (footballer)
