= Catherine Ugwu =

Catherine Ugwu MBE
- Born: 1964 (age 61–62)
- Occupations: Executive producer, creative director, consultant for ceremonies, large-scale events
- Years active: 1986–present
- Notable work: London 2012 Olympic and Paralympic Ceremonies
- Website: bettyproductions.com

Catherine Oliaku Ugwu MBE (born 1964) is a British executive producer, artistic director, and consultant working in large-scale ceremonies and events, including for the Summer and Winter Olympics, the Summer Paralympics, the Asian, European, Islamic Solidarity, and Commonwealth Games, and the Millennium Dome.

Ugwu began her career as a live arts curator, writer and editor, working in the main at the Institute of Contemporary Arts (ICA) and the Live Art Development Agency (LADA) with Lois Keidan.

She was appointed a Member of the Order of the British Empire (MBE) for services to the London 2012 Olympic and Paralympic Games.

== Career ==
=== Live arts ===
Ugwu first became involved in the area of performance and related practice in 1986, working freelance with a range of arts organisations and companies, including the Albany Empire Theatre, the Cheek by Jowl theatre company, the Black Theatre Co-operative, Chisenhale Dance Space, the National Review of Live Art (NRLA), and the Islington International Festival.

She joined the Institute of Contemporary Arts (ICA) in 1991, working with Lois Keidan as Deputy Director of Live Arts, and holding programming, curatorial, and commissioning responsibilities. The platform they created at the ICA is considered to have contributed to the growth of live art (as an artistic practice distinct from theatre or visual arts) in London and the UK during the 1990s. In a 1994 article contributed by Bernardine Evaristo to the black arts listings magazine Artrage, Ugwu described live art as "a way of examining cultural and ethnic identity and its effectiveness as a means of constructing and deconstructing identities and representations of ourselves".

While at the ICA, Ugwu compiled and edited a book of artworks and essays titled Let's Get It On: The Politics of Black Performance that included contributions by bell hooks and Paul Gilroy, and an essay of her own. It was "the first book to offer detailed analysis of black live art in Britain" and, as a "response to the absence of black live art history", the publication has been described as a "landmark collection", and "path-breaking". It received an Honourable Mention from the Arnold Rubin Outstanding Publication Award Committee of the Arts Council of the African Studies Association (ACASA) in 1998. As a writer, Ugwu also contributed to the Iniva/ICA exhibition catalogue Mirage: Enigmas of Race, Difference and Desire on the work of Frantz Fanon, and the Companion to Contemporary Black British Culture.

In 1997, Ugwu and Keidan left the ICA to form Keidan/Ugwu, "a company dedicated to locating time-based performance within a critical framework, but outside the institutional context". In 1999, Ugwu co-founded the Live Art Development Agency (LADA) with Keidan, serving as co-director until 2000. LADA has been described as "the most significant catalyst for the development of the Live Art sector in London and the UK more widely". Ugwu and Keidan also worked as curators and consultants at international festivals around the world, including the 1999 Festival De Beweeging in Antwerp.

Artists that Ugwu and Keidan collaborated with, both at the ICA and independently, include Forced Entertainment, La Ribot, Marina Abramović, ORLAN, Stelarc, Ron Athey, Ron Vawter, and Guillermo Gómez-Peña.

Ugwu was also a combined arts, dance and drama advisor for Arts Council England and the Londo-n Arts Board, chaired the boards of the intercultural arts organisation Motiroti (1996–1998), The Showroom gallery (1996–2000), and the Talawa Theatre Company (1998–2000), and contributed to UK and international conferences on issues of cultural diversity and live arts practice.

=== Ceremonies and events ===
Ugwu produced the Millennium Dome Opening Ceremony, held on 31 December 1999. In 2000, she left her position as co-director of the Live Art Development Agency to work as an independent producer on large-scale international events, and was a producer of the Manchester Commonwealth Games Closing Ceremony in 2002.

A Senior Producer for the Opening Ceremony of the 2006 Doha Asian Games, and for the strategic phase of the Vancouver 2010 Winter Olympic Opening, Victory, and Closing Ceremonies, Ugwu went on to work as Executive Producer of the Glasgow Handover Ceremony at the Closing Ceremony of the Delhi 2010 Commonwealth Games.

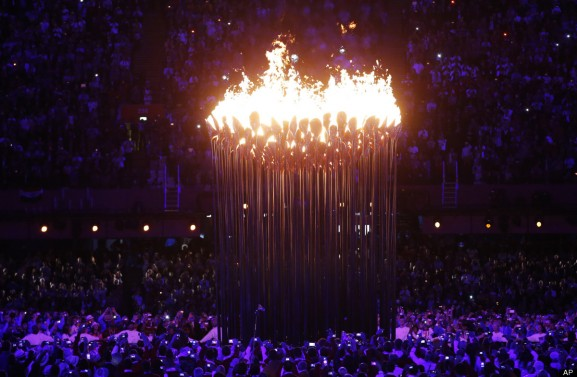
The London 2012 cauldron, codenamed "Betty" after Ugwu's dog

In 2010, Ugwu was appointed Executive Producer – Production of the London 2012 Olympic and Paralympic Ceremonies, alongside Stephen Daldry (Executive Producer – Creative) and Danny Boyle (Artistic Director of the Olympic Opening Ceremony). The Olympic Opening Ceremony was widely praised by the media: The Times described it as "a masterpiece", while The Daily Telegraph called it "brilliant, breathtaking, bonkers and utterly British". Ugwu was appointed a Member of the Order of the British Empire (MBE) in the 2013 New Year Honours for her work on London 2012.

Frank Cottrell-Boyce, the writer of the Opening Ceremony, revealed that the London 2012 cauldron designed by Thomas Heatherwick was codenamed "Betty" after Ugwu's dog, in order to maintain secrecy. A portrait of Ugwu with her dog Betty, taken by the photographer Jillian Edelstein, was commissioned by the National Portrait Gallery, London for its "Road to 2012: Aiming High" exhibition and primary collection.

In 2013, Ugwu founded her own production company, Betty Productions.

Ugwu executive produced the Save the Children "IF" Campaign in 2013, with the involvement of Danny Boyle, Bill Gates, Tamsin Greig, and Myleene Klass, and a live film event for Goldfrapp in 2014 – a 30-minute anthology film inspired by their album Tales of Us, and live performance at Air Studios in London, both transmitted into cinemas across the UK, Europe, North America, Australia and New Zealand.

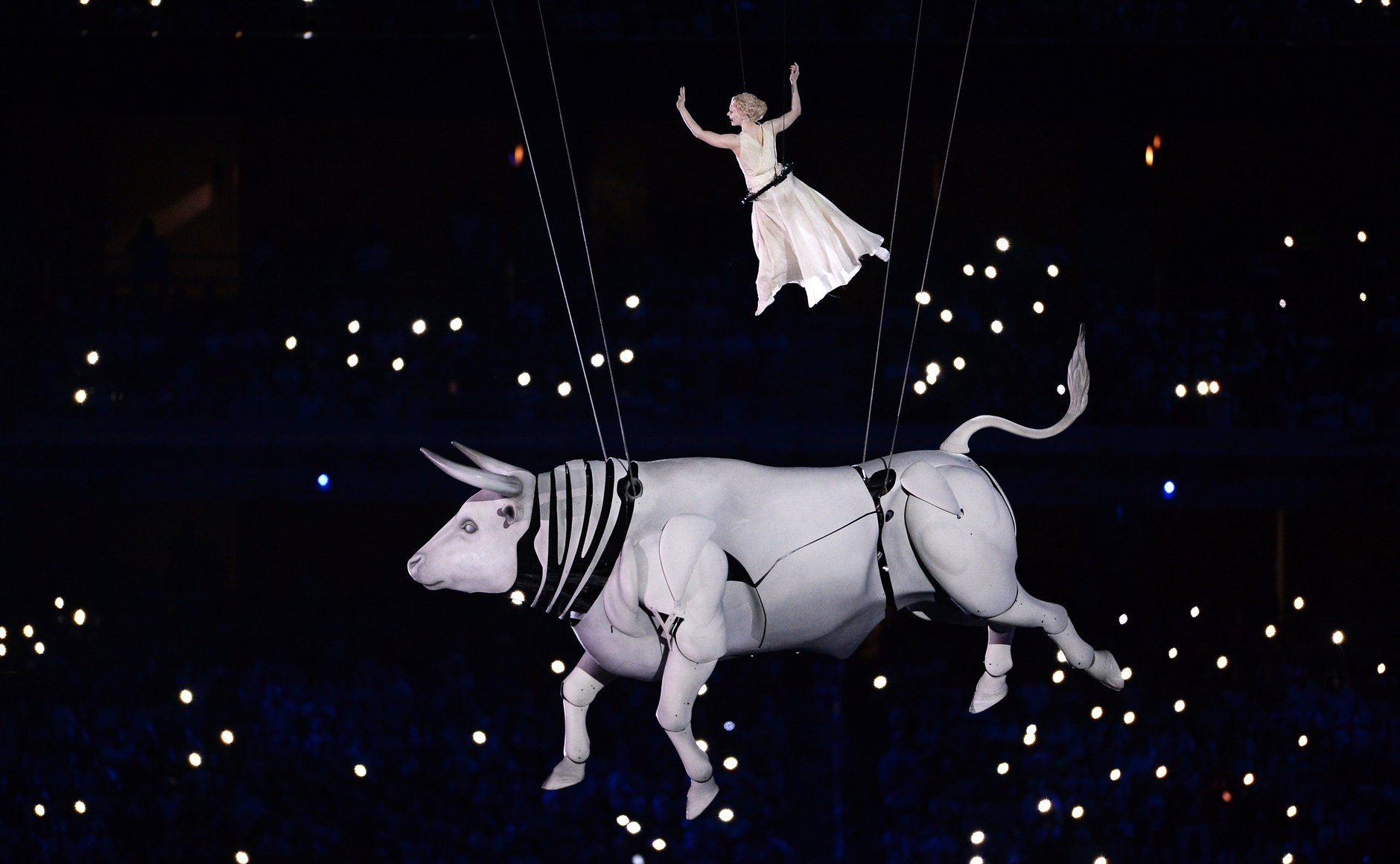
Europa and the Bull, a scene from the Baku 2015 Opening Ceremony

Ugwu was Director of Ceremonies for the Baku 2015 European Games, for which she was awarded the "Dostlug" Order of Friendship by the President of the Republic of Azerbaijan. The Opening Ceremony was an Olympic-scale stadium show that reportedly cost twice as much as that of the London 2012 Olympics. Directed by Dimitris Papaioannou, who also created the Opening Ceremony of the Athens 2004 Olympic Games, the Baku 2015 Opening Ceremony included a performance by Lady Gaga that was coordinated by Ugwu.

Ugwu served once more as Director of Ceremonies for the Baku 2017 Islamic Solidarity Games, and was also Executive Producer of the Baku 2017 Ceremonies.

Ugwu was the Lead Consultant for the Baku World Expo 2025 Bid, vying against three other candidate cities: Osaka, Paris, and Yekaterinberg. Ugwu also served as a Dubai World Expo 2020 Ceremonies Consultant.

In 2019, Ugwu was both Artistic Director and Executive Producer of the Official 48th UAE National Day Celebration in Abu Dhabi, a large-scale show held at the Zayed Sports City Stadium.

In 2020, Ugwu was appointed to the Education, Culture and Wellness Commission of the Global Esports Federation (GEF).
