= Ian Jeffrey =

English art historian, writer and curator

Ian Jeffrey is an English art historian, writer and curator.

Jeffrey is the author of a series of illustrated books on the history of photography. He is a recipient of the Royal Photographic Society's J. Dudley Johnston Award.

== Life and work ==
Jeffrey has held the posts of tutor and professor at Goldsmiths, University of London.

== Publications ==
=== Publications by Jeffrey ===
- The Real Thing: An Anthology of British Photographs 1840–1950, London: Arts Council of Great Britain, 1974.
- Photography: A Concise History. London: Thames & Hudson, 1981, 1989. ISBN 9780500201879.
- The British Landscape 1920-1950. London: Thames & Hudson, 1984. ISBN 978-0500233986.
- Timeframes: The Story of Photography. New York City: Watson-Guptill, 1998. ISBN 978-0817460150.
- An American Journey: The Photography of William England. Munich; New York; London: Prestel, 1999. ISBN 978-3791321585.
- ReVisions: An Alternative History of Photography. Bradford: National Museum of Photography, Film and Television, 1999. ISBN 978-0948489600.
- The Photography Book. London: Phaidon, 2005. ISBN 9780714844886.
  - Second, revised edition. London: Phaidon, 2014. ISBN 978-0714867380.
- How to Read a Photograph: Understanding, Interpreting and Enjoying the Great Photographers. London: Thames & Hudson, 2009. ISBN 978-0500287842.

=== Publications edited by Jeffrey ===
- Cityscape 1910-39: Urban Themes in American, German and British Art. London: Arts Council of Great Britain, 1977. ISBN 9780728701373. Exhibition catalogue.
- Bill Brandt: Photographs 1928-1983. London: Thames & Hudson, 1994. ISBN 978-0500277263.
- Josef Sudek. Phaidon 55. London; New York: Phaidon, 2001. ISBN 9780714841687.
- Shomei Tomatsu. London; New York: Phaidon, 2001. ISBN 9780714840192.
- Magnum Landscape. London; New York: Phaidon, 2005. ISBN 9780714845227.
- The Art of Kyffin Williams. London: Royal Academy of Arts, 2007. With Nicholas Sinclair. ISBN 9781905711000.
- Bill Brandt. Photofile. London: Thames & Hudson, 2007. ISBN 978-0500410882.

== Awards ==
- 2005: J. Dudley Johnston Award, Royal Photographic Society, Bath. Shared with David Alan Mellor.

== Exhibitions ==
=== Exhibitions of Jeffrey's photographs ===
- Universal Pictures, Kettle's Yard, Cambridge, 2005/2006

=== Exhibitions curated by Jeffrey ===
- The Real Thing, Hayward Gallery, 1974. Curated by Jeffrey and David Alan Mellor.
- Cityscape 1910-39: Urban Themes in American, German and British Art, Cartwright Hall, Bradford, 1977; City Museum and Art Gallery, Portsmouth, 1977; Laing Art Gallery, Newcastle-upon-Tyne, 1977; Royal Academy of Arts, London, 1978. Curated by Jeffrey and David Alan Mellor.
