= Nicholas Sinclair =

British photographer

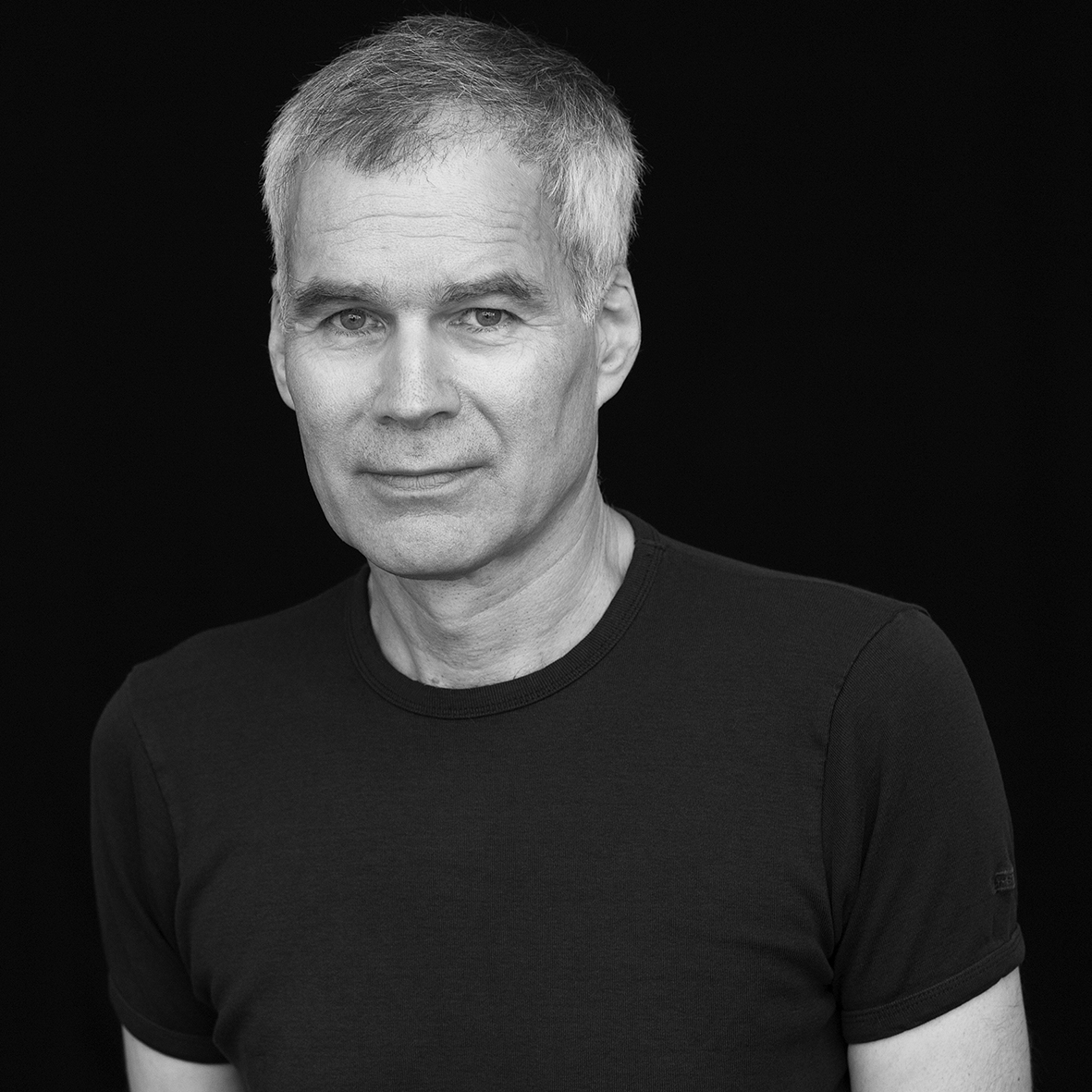
- Nicholas Sinclair
- Born: 1954; London, Britain
- Occupation: Photographer

Nicholas Sinclair (born 1954) is a British portrait and landscape photographer whose career spans more than four decades. He is known principally for his of portraits of artists and other cultural figures, combining formal composition with an interest in the relationship between the sitter and their creative environment. His work has been extensively published and exhibited in Britain and Europe since the mid 1990s and eight books of his work have been published.

== Life and work ==
Sinclair was born in London. He studied fine art at Newcastle University.

His career as a photographer began in 1982 with a series of photographs taken in the circus which were first exhibited in 1983 at the University of Sussex and subsequently published in the British Journal of Photography.

He is known principally as a portrait photographer, his subjects include Anthony Caro, Frank Auerbach, John Piper and Paula Rego. He has edited two books about the Welsh artist Kyffin Williams and made portraits of him.

Sinclair also makes landscape photographs. He has made two books, one on European cities and the other on a lake.

Sinclair now lives between the cities of Brighton, England, and Berlin, Germany.

== Publications ==
=== Publications by Sinclair ===
- The Chameleon Body. London: Lund Humphries, 1996. ISBN 0-85331-6961. With essays by David Alan Mellor and Anthony Shelton.
- Franko B. London: Black Dog, 1998. ISBN 1-901033-55-4. With essays by Stuart Morgan and Lois Keidan.
- Portraits of Artists. London: Lund Humphries, 2000. ISBN 0-85331-799-2. With an essay by Ian Jeffrey, and a conversation between Sinclair and Robin Dance.
- Crossing the Water. Brighton: Photoworks, 2002. ISBN 1-903796-02-4. With an essay by David Alan Mellor and an afterword by Ian Jeffrey.
- Berlin: Imagining the Tri Chord. London: Royal Academy of Arts, 2007. ISBN 978-1-905711-10-9. With an essay by David Chandler.
- Five Cities. London: Royal Academy of Arts, 2010. ISBN 978-1-905711-57-4. With an essay by Nicky Hamlyn.

=== Publications edited by Sinclair ===
- John Holloway Downlandscapes. Self-published, 2004. ISBN 09522338-1-9.
- Kyffin Williams. London: Lund Humphries, 2004. ISBN 1-85437-511-3.
- The Art of Kyffin Williams. London: Royal Academy of Arts, 2007. ISBN 978-1-905711-00-0.

== Awards ==
In 2003, he won the Hasselblad Masters Award.

== Exhibitions ==
=== Solo exhibitions ===
- 1983: Gardner Arts Centre, University of Sussex, Brighton
- 2014: Pallant House Gallery, Chichester

=== Other exhibitions ===
His work has been exhibited eight times at the National Portrait Gallery, London.

== Collections ==
Sinclair's work is held in these permanent collections:

- National Portrait Gallery, London
- Solomon R. Guggenheim Foundation, Venice, Italy.
- Victoria and Albert Museum, London
