= 2012 Summer Olympics and Paralympics cauldron =

Artwork by Thomas Heatherwick in London for the Games of the 30th Olympiad

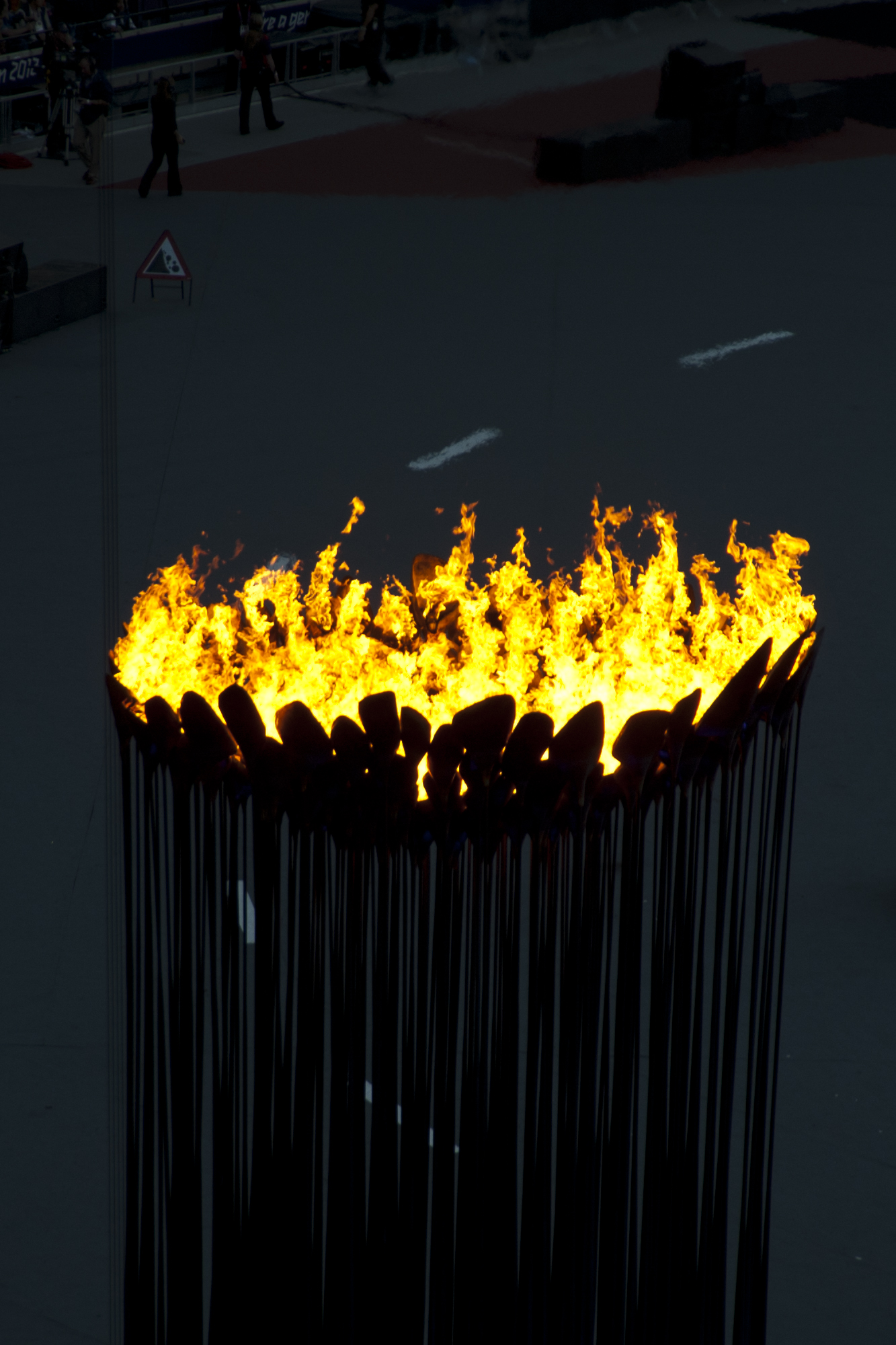
The cauldron

The 2012 Summer Olympics and Paralympics cauldron was used for the Olympic flame during the Summer Olympics and Paralympics of London 2012. The cauldron was designed by Thomas Heatherwick and described as "one of the best-kept secrets of the opening ceremony": until it was lit during the Olympics ceremony, neither its design and location, nor who would light it, had been revealed. For the Olympics it consisted of 204 individual 'petals', and for the Paralympics 164, one for each competing nation.

== Commission and design ==
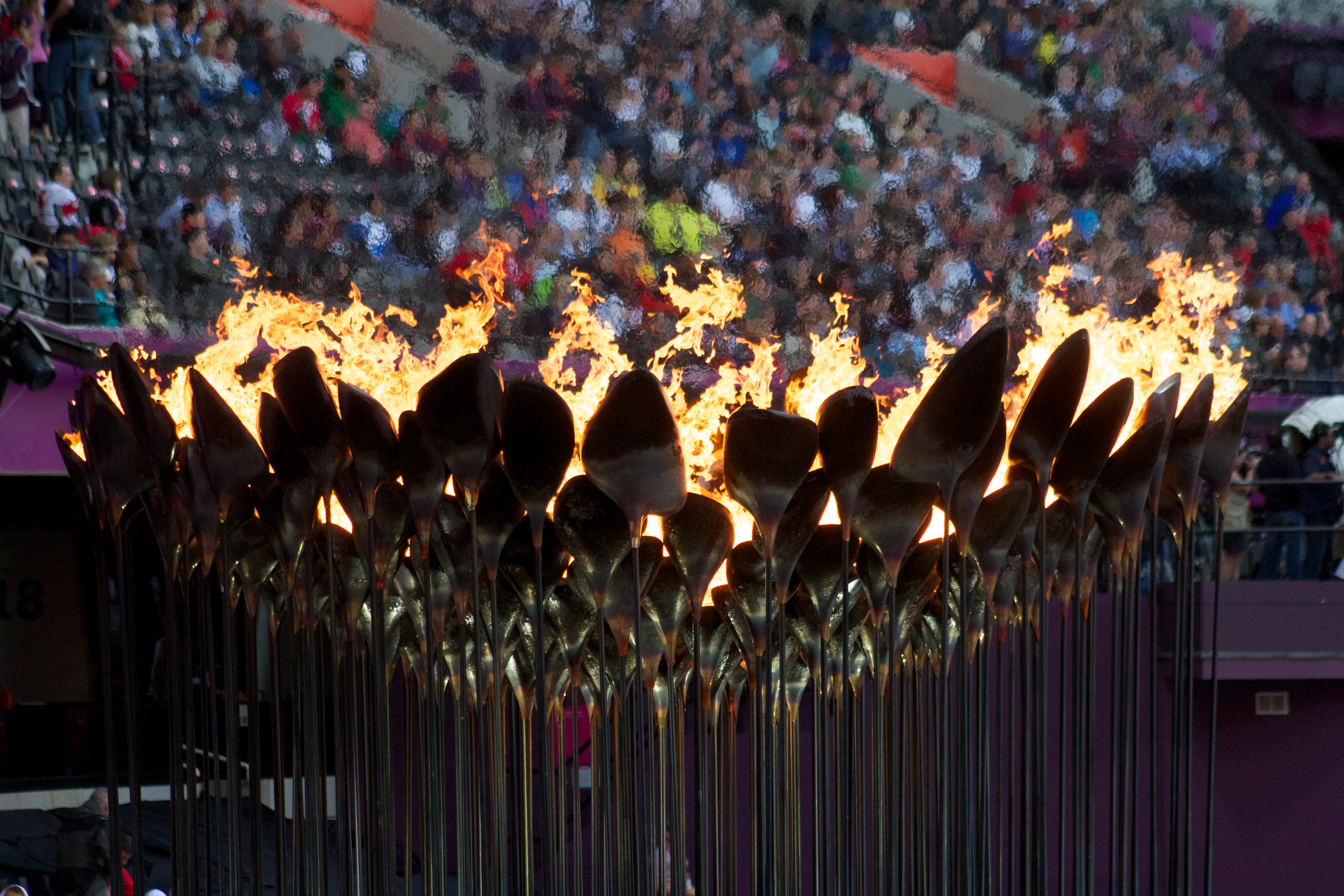
Detail of the Olympic cauldron showing the 'petals'

British designer Thomas Heatherwick was chosen by Danny Boyle to design the cauldron for the 2012 London Summer Olympics and Paralympic Games (the same design would serve both). Heatherwick was a highly regarded designer, responsible for the first prize-winning "Seed Cathedral" at the 2010 Shanghai Expo, and the New Routemaster bus introduced in London in February 2012; Boyle was an admirer of his B of the Bang sculpture in Manchester, saying of it 'I loved it so much; it's a tragedy they took it down in 2009 ... These public sculptures breathe life into you.'

"But we had to fight to have it on the floor of the stadium. The organisers had already decided that the torch was going to be on the roof, which is where they always are. ... Why would you do that? ... I was really clear that wasn't going to happen. I hate that. Those traditional cauldrons have no humanity about them at all; they're just vast, bombastic pieces that weight fifty tons. We wanted something that had some humanity and warmth about it rather than shock and awe. It's a key moment in the opening ceremony, and it's what all the other events are leading up to. It's really what you're there to do: to light the cauldron."

— Danny Boyle, in Danny Boyle: Creating Wonder by Amy Raphael, 2013, p. 407.

The brief was that the cauldron should be something that connected all the nations, with the idea of them each bringing a constituent part of it, and also have a story or narrative. It was to be of a human scale, and to be placed among the people in the stadium rather than towering over it. It was also to be transient, like the coming-together of nations during each Games.

Heatherwick said “When Danny Boyle asked us to do this we felt this huge responsibility. We asked people: ‘Which cauldron do you remember?’ And the answer was: none. Our role was to design a 'moment': how could we make this moment manifest in the object? We didn't just want to make a bowl on a stick.” He was also keen to avoid the competitive aspect of designs for the previous Olympics: "We were aware that cauldrons have been getting bigger, higher and fatter as each Olympics has happened and we felt that we shouldn't try to be even bigger than the last ones." Heatherwick and his team spent two months researching and examining ideas, including a weekend spent looking at all previous Olympic cauldron designs.

Another important part of the brief was "Whatever you do, no moving parts". This was due to the failure of the cauldron at the 2010 Winter Olympics at Vancouver, when one of the four moving parts of the cauldron had failed to work. Heatherwick said “When we proposed the most moving parts ever in an Olympic cauldron, we were nervous and feeling a bit guilty about that. But the same man who’d said that to us was the first person to say yes.”

Heatherwick wanted the cauldron to be a focal point, like an altar in a church, and he described it as symbolising "the coming together in peace of 204 nations for two weeks of sporting competition ... a representation of the extraordinary, albeit transitory, togetherness that the Olympic Games symbolise" The Olympic cauldron comprised 204 separate copper 'petals', and the Paralympic one 164 – one petal from each of the competing nations.

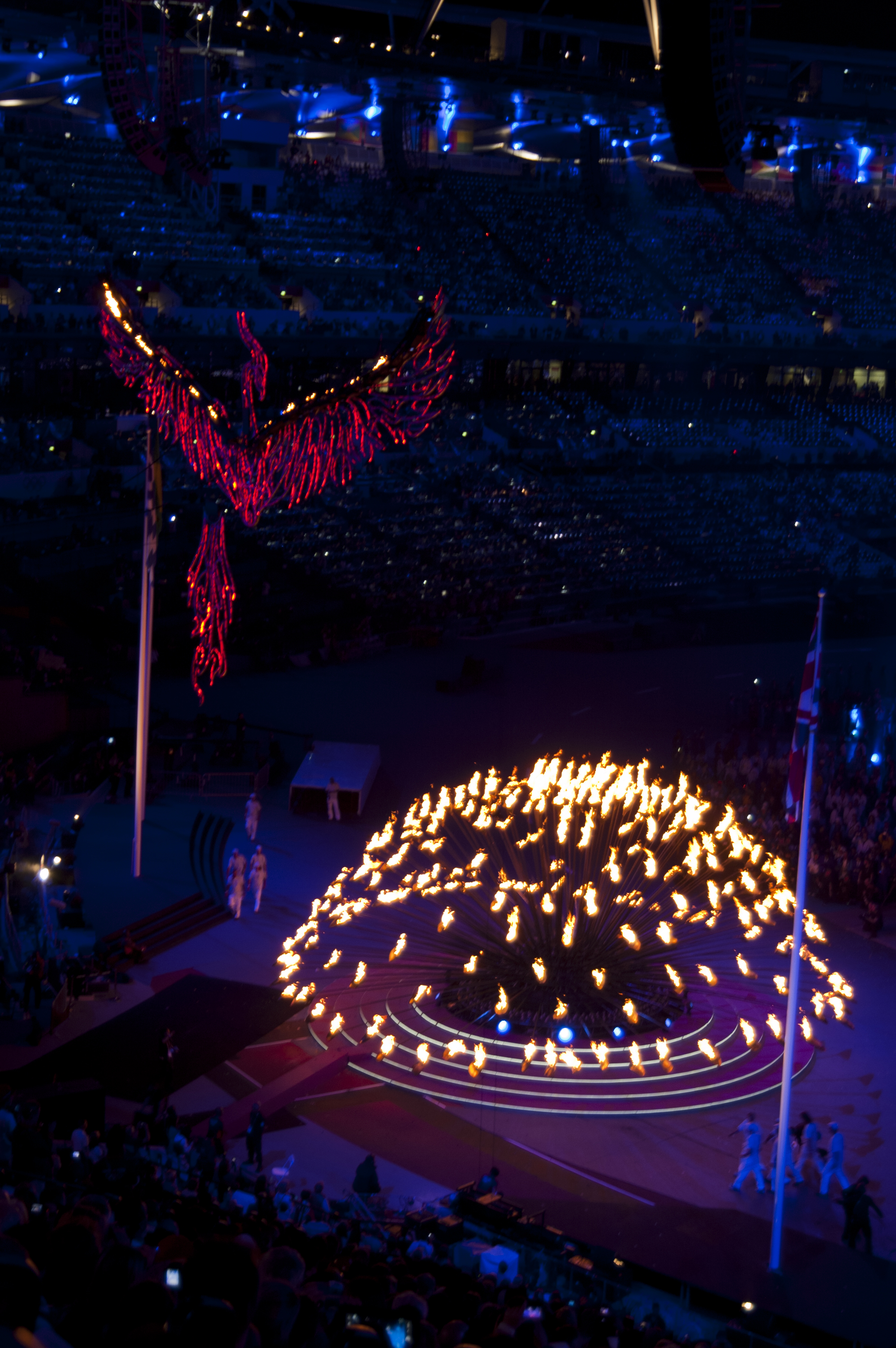
The Olympic cauldron at the 2012 Summer Olympics closing ceremony, opening out prior to being extinguished

== Production ==
Production began in January 2012 in the workshops of Tockwith, near Harrogate-based firm Stage One, a company that also built the two cauldrons for the 2026 Winter Games. Each 3mm thick petal was unique: designed individually using 3D modelling, hand beaten from copper sheeting, and polished by skilled craftsmen. Each was hand-beaten over its own individual MDF former and took eight hours to produce. The petals were inscribed with the name of the competing country and "The XXX Olympiad – London 2012". Three full sets were made: for Olympic and Paralympic cauldrons, with a third for rehearsals and testing. The work on the cauldron at Stage One took 25,000 man hours.

The cauldron measured 8.5 metres high, 8 metres across when flat on the ground, and weighed 16 tonnes. It was significantly smaller and lighter than those of previous Games: the Beijing 2008 Summer Olympics cauldron weighed 300 tonnes. The cauldron burned natural gas, with a variable burn rate. The gas burners were designed by Australian firm FCT Flames based in Adelaide, which specialises in the design, manufacture and operation of ceremonial cauldrons around the world.The firm became a partner of the International Olympic Committee shortly after the 2000 Summer Olympics and became responsible for manufacturing the fuel in which the Olympic flame burns during the relay and in many cases was responsible for the construction and elaboration of the Pyre that burned during the 16 days of the Olympic Games and 12 days of the Paralympic Games in the host city. The mechanical and electrical engineering of the cauldron was complex and demanded the most time of the project, due to the large number of moving parts. 15 km of wiring went into the control panels and another 5.5 km into the cauldron itself.

Strict security and secrecy was paramount during construction and testing. During the project's first phase, which consisted of elaboration, assembly and first tests, the structure was codenamed "Betty", after the dog of the opening ceremony's executive producer Catherine Ugwu.

The cauldron was installed in the centre of the arena of Olympic Stadium using a 500-ton crane. This was done during overnight on 10 June 2012, in order to maintain the greatest secret of the opening ceremonies. All the tests and rehearsals were held late at night or in the early morning hours when Olympic airspace restrictions were in place, which stopped civil helicopters or planes from getting a view and take photos During final tests on the eve of the opening ceremony, one of the rods holding the petals became jammed, necessitating overnight repairs; this news was deliberately withheld from Heatherwick. Despite the secrecy, an image of the cauldron was visible in plain sight on the ceremony's tickets.

== Use ==
=== In the Olympics ===
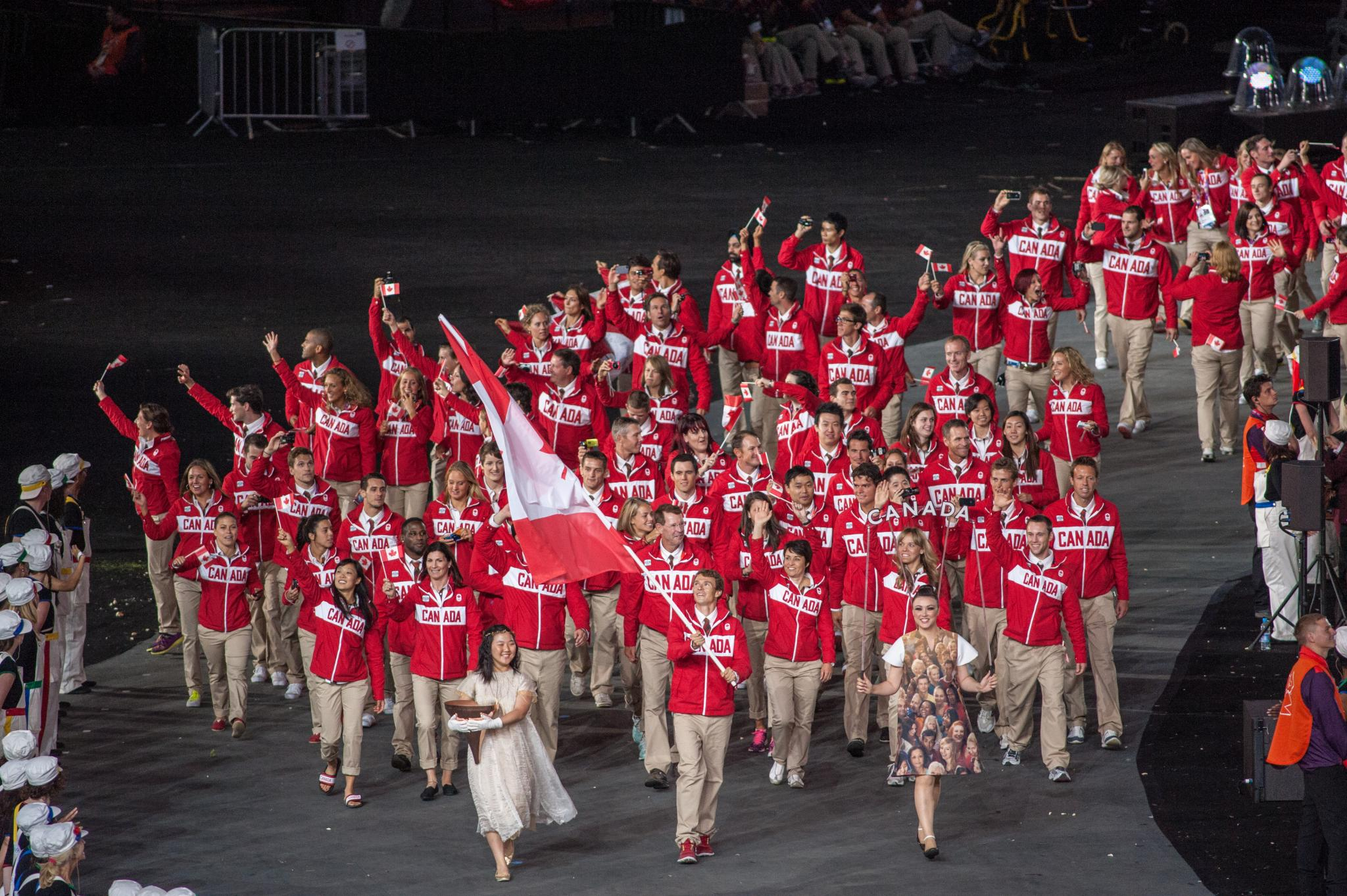
The Canadian Olympic team entering the stadium with a girl carrying Canada's petal for the cauldron

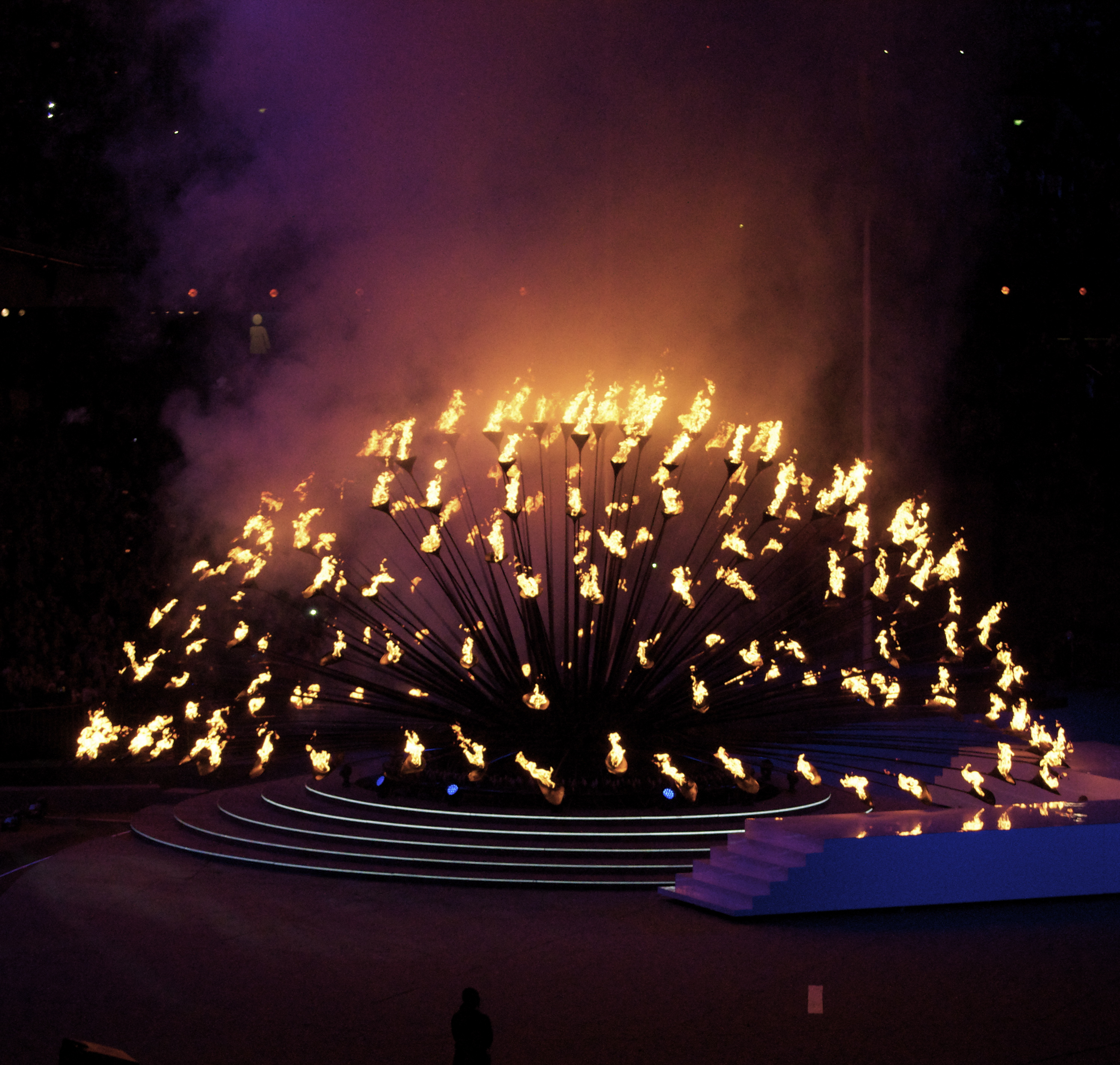
The cauldron opening out at the 2012 Summer Olympics closing ceremony

On arriving in London, each national team was presented with an inscribed petal. A 205th petal was given to the athletes competing under the IOC flag.

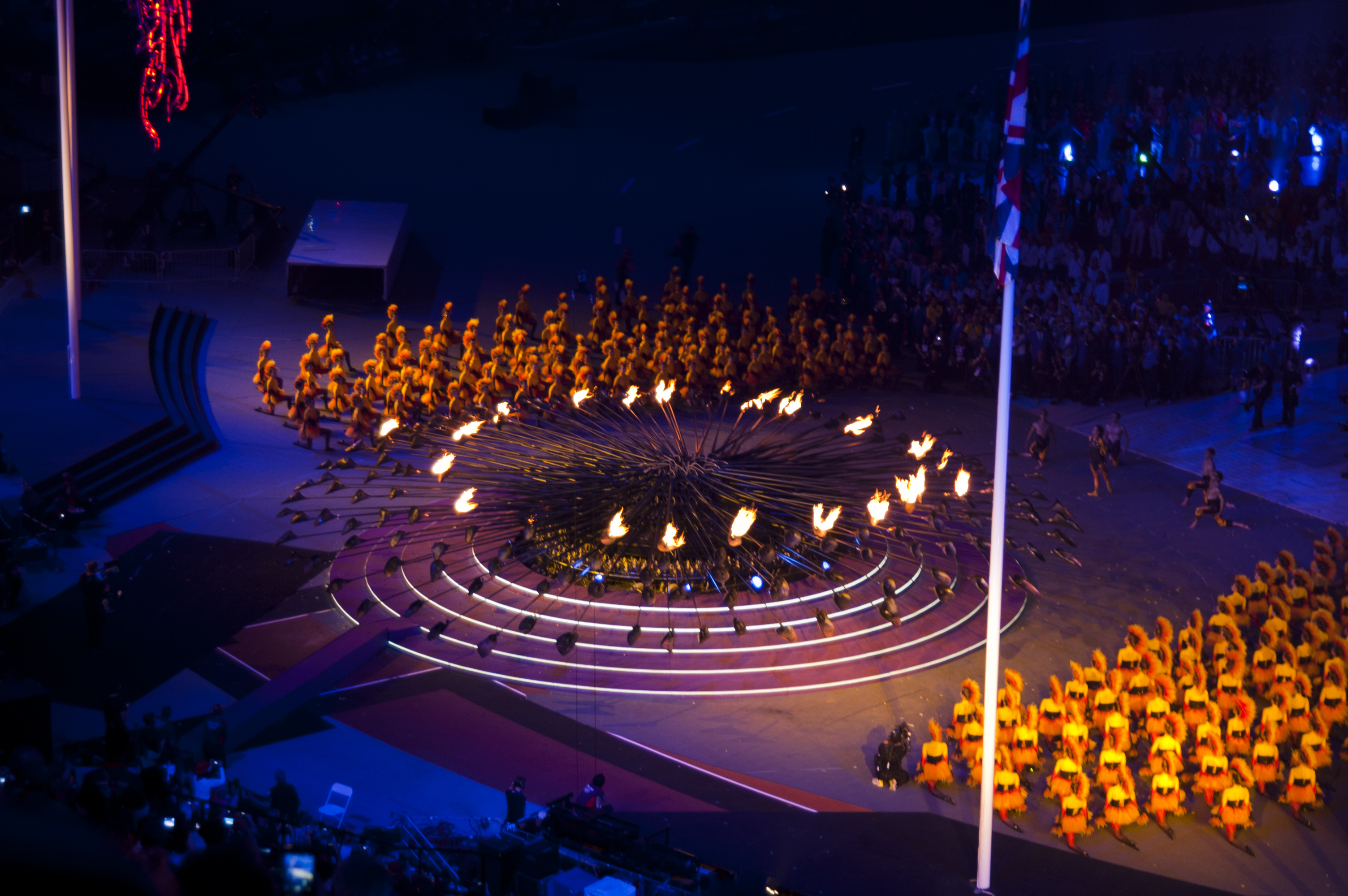
Extinguishing of the Olympic cauldron at the 2012 Summer Olympics closing ceremony

During the parade at the opening ceremony, each petal was carried by a child accompanying each of the teams as they entered the stadium. The children wore gloves to avoid staining the copper. The petals (except from the independent athletes) were then passed secretly to fifteen technicians who, out of sight in the centre of the stadium, fitted them to the ends of the stainless steel stems as they lay flat on the ground. Its location was kept secret until the event; during the ceremony some people had speculated that it might be hidden under the Glastonbury Tor model at the end of the stadium.

The identity of the athlete who was to light the cauldron also remained secret. It transpired that, to reflect 'Inspire a Generation' theme of the 2012 Games, seven young athletes were chosen for that honour. Sir Steve Redgrave carried the flame into the stadium and passed it on to one of a team of six young athletes and one young volunteer, each nominated by a famous British Olympian. The torchbearers were (nominator in brackets): Callum Airlie (Shirley Robertson), Jordan Duckitt (Duncan Goodhew), Desirèe Henry (Daley Thompson), Katie Kirk (Mary Peters), Cameron MacRitchie (Steve Redgrave), Aidan Reynolds (Lynn Davies) and Adelle Tracey (Kelly Holmes).

The seven stepped forward together to light a petal each. Flames spread radially around the petals, and when all were alight, the stems rose slowly from the floor of the arena and converged to form an upright cauldron with a single, massive flame. The music performed during this part of the ceremony was the specially-commissioned "Caliban's Dream".

After the ceremony, the stadium was closed and on the following night the cauldron moved from infield to the end of the stadium formerly occupied by the Olympic Bell. During this move the Olympic flame was kept burning in a small Davy lamp, similar to those used during the torch relay. The cauldron was relit in its new spot by Austin Playfoot, who had carried an Olympic torch in both the 1948 and 2012 Games.

For the closing ceremony, the operation of the cauldron was played in reverse: it opened out until flat on the ground, and the flames in the petals extinguished one by one.

=== In the Paralympics ===
For the opening ceremony, the 164 petals were pre-set prior to lighting in a semi-spherical arrangement, and the flames lit from one side of the dome to the other, unlike the spiral of the Olympic cauldron. It was lit by Margaret Maughan, Britain's first Gold medallist in the Paralympic Games.

After the closing ceremony, the Paralympic cauldron was extinguished by swimmer Eleanor Simmonds and sprinter Jonnie Peacock. All but one of the petals were extinguished; Simmonds and Peacock lit new torches and distributed the fire to other performers across the stadium to represent an eternal flame.

=== After the Games ===
Heatherwick had intended that there would not be a large cauldron left after the Games, but instead each petal was to be offered to competing countries as a souvenir. After London 2012, the cauldron was dismantled and the petals returned to the Stage One workshops. Here they were cleaned to remove most of the dirt, smuts and corrosion from the prolonged period of burning, but not re-polished. Presentation of petals began on 7 November 2012 to the British Olympic Association, represented by Olympian David Hemery, followed by the British Paralympic Association the next day. All petals had been presented to their respective countries by the end of 2012. The presentation boxes were also designed by Heatherwick.

The day after the Olympics opening ceremony, details of the design, including a scale model, were added to the exhibition of Heatherwick's work that was running at the Victoria and Albert Museum in London. A selection of components and mechanisms of the cauldron were put on permanent display at the Museum of London in July 2014, to mark the second anniversary of the Games.

== Reception ==
The cauldron received overwhelmingly positive reviews. The London Evening Standard called it "breathtakingly beautiful", while a reviewer for The Daily Telegraph commented that "It dazzles both by its exuberance and inventive dexterity". The Guardian said it was "surely one of the most enduring images of London 2012 ... the drawing together of 204 long-stemmed and flaming petals seemed to prompt a collective gasp of delight across the UK – for its symbolism as well as its technical grace." Creative Review said "From the moment it was lit to its last flicker, Heatherwick Studio's cauldron was an absolute star of the Games. Conceptually brilliant and utterly beautiful it was one of the most successful examples of an ambition among the Games' organisers to reinvent the familiar elements of the Olympics." A reviewer for the Sydney Morning Herald called the cauldron "stunning".

== Controversy ==
=== Siting of cauldron ===
The London stadium had been designed assuming that the cauldron would sit above, as had become customary, on a part of the roof that was specially strengthened. However, to conform with the brief, the cauldron was not to be "like an emergency police siren sitting on top of a car"; it was to be inside the stadium, at the very centre for its lighting and then moved and burning at one side of the stadium for the duration of the Games. "The spirit Danny was speaking about...was to do with connecting more with people and rooting things, rather than them just being up in the air like a dream in the sky. And we were looking at pictures together in my studio, like the London 1948 games and there the cauldron was sitting in among the spectators in the stadium, it was there with everybody...a participant rather than a beacon in the sky". This was to prove a controversial decision, as it meant that visitors to the Olympic Park to watch the other sports were denied the customary view of the flame over the stadium. The cauldron was therefore shown on video screens around the Olympic Park.

=== Plagiarism claim ===
In June 2013, New York design studio Atopia claimed that the design was identical to something they had presented to the London Olympic committee (LOCOG) in 2007; they stated they had not raised this earlier because of the restrictive non-disclosure agreement all companies had signed. Heatherwick denied that he had been briefed about Atopia's idea, and was adamant that the design was his alone. Danny Boyle also denied knowing about the earlier proposal, while Martin Green, former head of ceremonies at LOCOG, claimed that the idea had emerged from discussions between Boyle, Heatherwick and himself. The accountants handling LOCOG's affairs after it ended its work in May 2013 later reached an out-of-court settlement, and issued a statement listing two sets of key concepts by Atopia (without specifically acknowledging fault); Heatherwick and Boyle were not consulted about this.

== Accolades ==
An end of year review chose the cauldron as one of the top five design highlights of 2012, and Heatherwick was voted the Architects' Journal architecture personality of 2012 by its readers. On 12 March 2013 it was announced that the cauldron had won the Visual Arts category of the 2012 South Bank Sky Arts Awards. The cauldron was shortlisted for the Design Museum's 'Designs of the Year 2013' Awards in the 'Product' category.

== See also ==
- 2012 Summer Olympics opening ceremony
- 2012 Summer Olympics closing ceremony
- 2012 Summer Paralympics opening ceremony
- 2012 Summer Paralympics closing ceremony

== Gallery ==
Sequence showing the cauldron starting to open out before it is extinguished at the 2012 Summer Olympics closing ceremony.

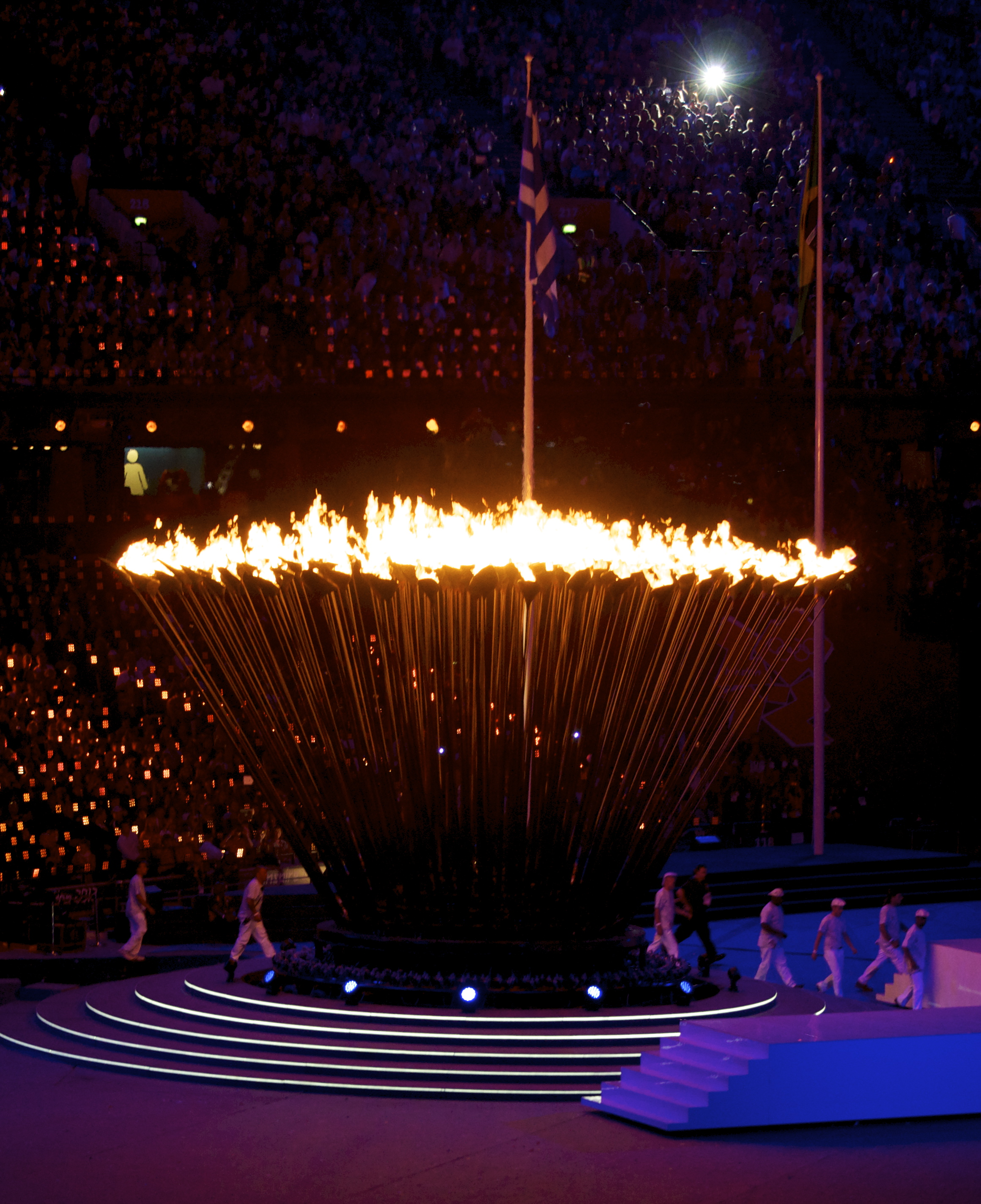

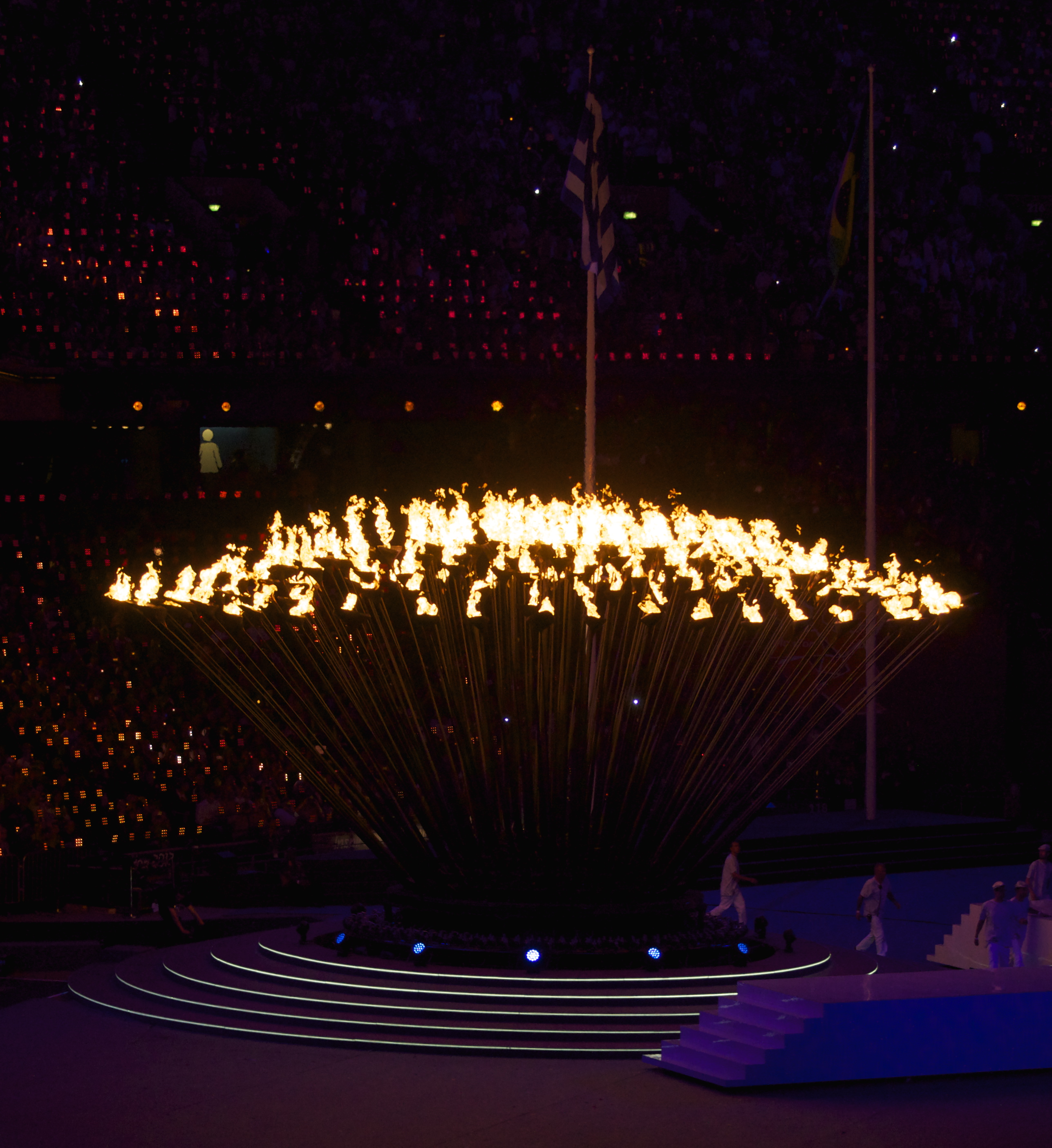

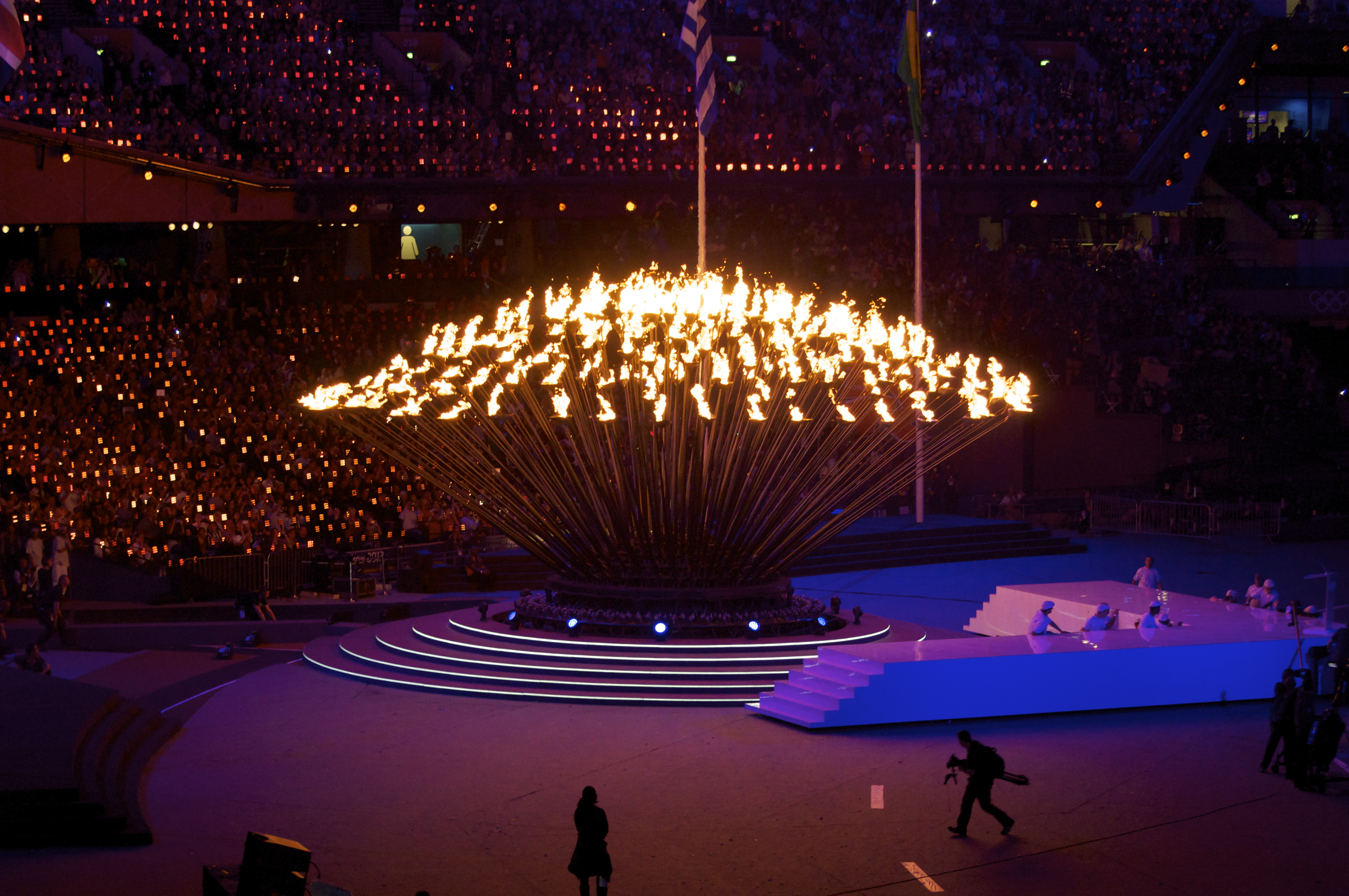

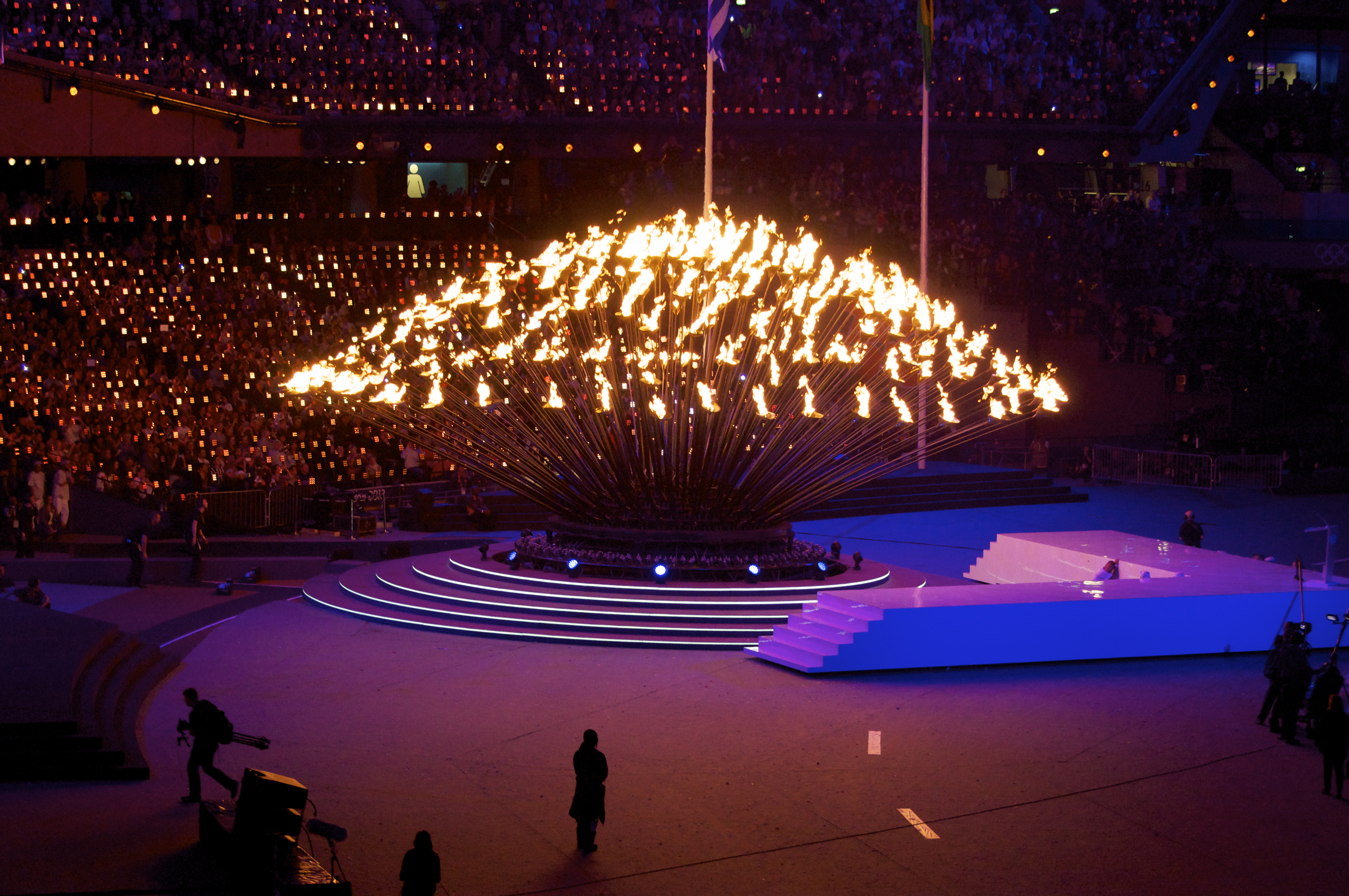

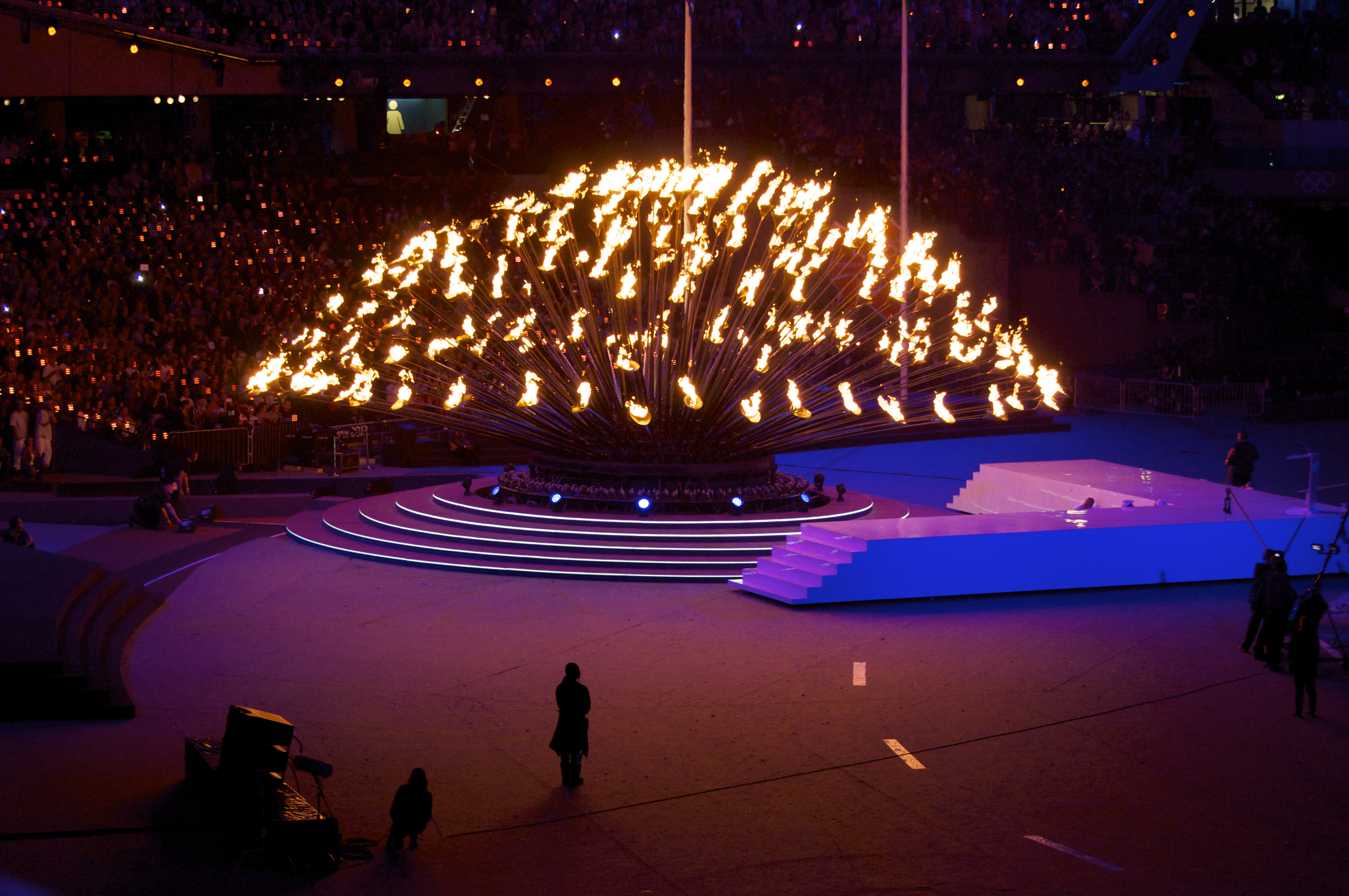

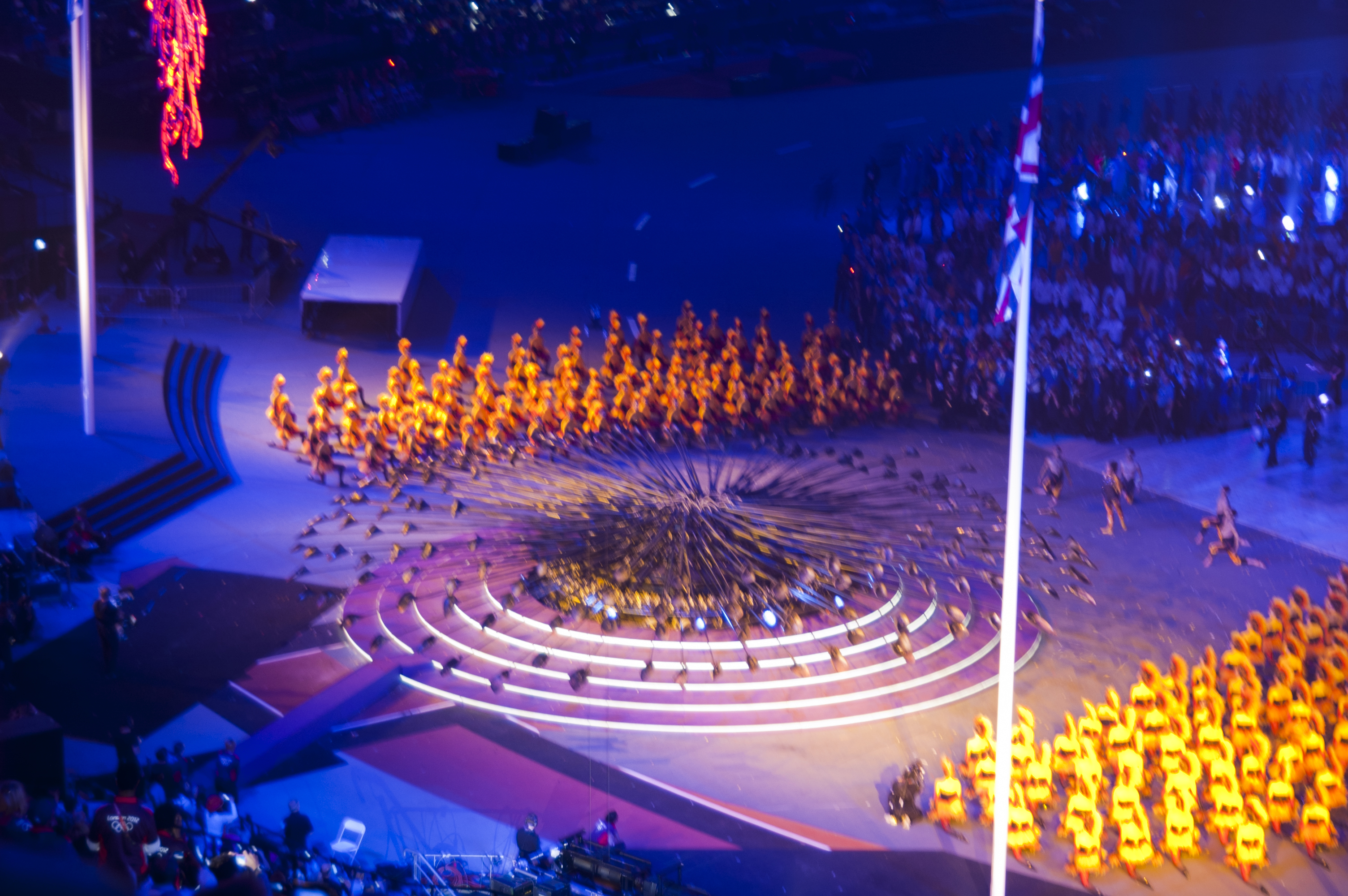
