= Lois Keidan =

Lois Keidan is a British-born cultural activist and writer. She co-founded the Live Art Development Agency with Catherine Ugwu in 1999 and was the Director of the Agency until 2021. She was the former director of live arts at the Institute of Contemporary Arts (ICA) from 1992 to 1997. Prior to working at the ICA, she was responsible for national policy and provision for Performance Art and interdisciplinary practices at the Arts Council of Great Britain.

Keidan is a proponent and advocate for Live Art in the UK and has been instrumental in the development and support of artists who have tended to be 'marginalised, misunderstood and misrepresented".

Keidan has written articles and edited books on performance and Live Art and made contributions to a range of journals and publications. She regularly gives talks and presentations on performance and Live Art at festivals, colleges, venues and conferences in Britain and internationally. She has participated in a number of boards and advisory panels, including Artsadmin (London) and Performa (New York), and is currently on the board of Spill Festival. In 1999, she was awarded an honorary fellowship by Dartington College of Arts, and in 2009 she was awarded an honorary fellowship by Queen Mary, University of London.

== Arts Council Report 1991 ==
In response to the significant shifts in the performance art scene in the UK in the 1980s and 1990s, Keidan authored the Arts Council of Great Britain's Strategy: Discussion Document on Live Art in 1991. This document was written to "map current practices and provisions for live art as well as to identify key issues". The report used the term Live Art, instead of performance art to define a set of practices and cultural strategies that were apparent in the UK at the time. The report covered "areas as diverse as the history, development, status of artists, critical coverage, potential venues and training/education".

== Publications ==
- Strategy: Discussion Document on Live Art, report for Arts Council of Great Britain (1991)
- Franko B by Nicholas Sinclair, Stuart Morgan and Keidan (1998)
- Exposures by Manuel Vason, Keidan and Ron Athey (2002)
- Sheng Qi: Madness, Appropriation by Huang Du, Keidan, Wang Ming'an and Hou Hanru (2005)
- Programme Notes: Case Studies for Locating Experimental Theatre by Daniel Brine and Keidan (2007)
- Access All Areas: Live Art and Disability by Keidan and C. J. Mitchell (2012)
- Programme Notes: Case Studies for Locating Experimental Theatre by Keidan and CJ Mitchell (2013)
- The Live Art Almanac: Volume 3 by Keidan and Aaron Wright (2014)
