= Adrian Heathfield =

British writer and curator

Adrian Heathfield is a British writer and curator.

== Overview ==
Heathfield works on contemporary art practices, particularly those involving live elements such as performance art, experimental theatre and dance. His writing has focused on questions of time, memory and the "ethics of the encounter between the spectator and the artwork".

He is the author of a monograph on the Taiwanese-American artist Tehching Hsieh. He has edited a number of books on live art and was the co-curator of the Live Culture events at Tate Modern, London (2003). He is co-director of a three-year AHRC funded research project, Performance Matters, on the cultural value of performance.

== Career ==
Heathfield received his PhD from the University of Bristol (1997). He was President of Performance Studies international (2003–07). He is currently Professor of Performance and Visual Culture at the University of Roehampton, London.

== Background ==
Heathfield is the son of trade union leader Peter Heathfield (General Secretary of the National Union of Mineworkers 1984–92) and the feminist activist Betty Heathfield (co-founder of Women Against Pit Closures during the 1984–85 miners' strike).

== Bibliography ==
- Perform, Repeat, Record: Live Art in History, co-editor with Amelia Jones. Bristol: Intellect and the University of Chicago Press, 2012.
- Out of Now: The Lifeworks of Tehching Hsieh, London and Cambridge, Massachusetts: Live Art Development Agency and MIT Press, 2009.
- Live: Art and Performance, editor, London: Tate Publishing and Routledge, 2004.
- Small Acts: Performance, the Millennium and the Marking of Time, editor, London: Black Dog Publishing, 2000.
- Shattered Anatomies: Traces of the Body in Performance, editor, Bristol: Arnolfini Live, 1997.
