= David Alan Mellor =

British curator, professor and writer

David Alan Mellor (1948–2023) was a British curator, professor and writer. He was awarded the Royal Photographic Society's J. Dudley Johnston Award and Education Award.

== Life and career ==
David Mellor — as he was called before he began using his full name professionally to avoid confusion with the politician of the same name — grew up in Leicester as the child of a lorry-driver and a hairdresser; he attended school intermittently due to his severe asthma. As an undergraduate he studied art at Sussex University under Quentin Bell. During this time Asa Briggs, then Vice-Chancellor of the University, received the archive of Mass-Observation from Tom Harrisson. For his first job Mellor catalogued this archive, and he then published and curated exhibitions about the substantial collection of pre-war photographs of working-class life contained within it.

Exhibitions curated by Mellor include Paradise Lost: The New Romantic Imagination in Britain (Barbican Centre, 1987); The Sixties (1993); and Co-Optic & Documentary Photography Group (Brighton Photo Biennial, 2014). As a professor of art at Sussex University, his students included Jeremy Deller.

He died in September 2023.

== Awards ==
- 2005: Royal Photographic Society's J. Dudley Johnston Award, shared with Ian Jeffrey
- 2015: Royal Photographic Society's Education Award

== Publications ==
- Cecil Beaton. London: Jonathan Cape, 1994; ISBN 0-224-04122-3; coedited with Philippe Garner
- Arthur Tress: Centric 52: Requiem for a Paperweight. Long Beach: California State University, University Art Museum, 1994; ISBN 0-936270-33-0
- David Hiscock. London: Zelda Cheatle, 1995. ISBN 0-9518371-9-2
- Sixties London: The Photographs of Robert Whitaker 1965–70. Sydney: Art Gallery of New South Wales, 1996.
- The Only Blonde in the World: Pauline Boty, 1938–1966. London: AM Publications, 1998. ISBN 0-9509896-2-2; with Sue Watling.
- Chemical Traces: Photography and Conceptual Art, 1968–1998. Kingston upon Hull: Kingston upon Hull City Museums & Art Galleries, 1998; ISBN 0-904490-19-X.
- The Barry Joule Archive: Works on Paper Attributed to Francis Bacon. Dublin: Irish Museum of Modern Art, 2000; ISBN 1-873654-84-7.
- The Sixties: Britain and France, 1962–1973: The Utopian Years. London: Philip Wilson, 2001; ISBN 0-85667-467-2.
- Tracing Light. Maidstone: Photoworks, 2001; ISBN 0-9517427-8-7; with Garry Fabian Miller.
- The Art of Robyn Denny. London: Black Dog, 2002; ISBN 1-901033-33-3.
- Interpreting Lucian Freud. London: Tate, 2002; ISBN 1-85437-442-7.
- Van Gogh vu par Bacon. Arles: Actes sud, 2002; ISBN 2-7427-3840-1; Vincent van Gogh as seen by Francis Bacon, edited by Mellor and Yolande Clergue (in French)
- Liliane Lijn: Works 1959–80. Warwick: Mead Gallery, University of Warwick, 2005; ISBN 0-902683-75-6
- No Such Thing as Society: Photography in Britain 1967–1987: From the British Council and the Arts Council Collection. London: Hayward Publishing, 2007; ISBN 978-1-85332-265-5.
- Antonioni's "Blow-up". Göttingen: Steidl, 2010. ISBN 9783869300238; with Philippe Garner.
- The Essential Cecil Beaton: Photographs 1920–1970. Munich: Schirmer Mosel, 2012. ISBN 9783829606103; with Philippe Garner.
  - The Essential Cecil Beaton: Photographien 1920–1970. Munich: Schirmer Mosel, 2012. ISBN 9783829606097; translated into German by Martina Tichy.
  - The Essential Cecil Beaton: Photographies 1920–1970. Malakoff: Hazan, 2012. ISBN 9782754106672; translated into French by Patrick Bouthinon.
  - Cecil Beaton: Retrospectiva. Barcelona: Lunwerg, 2012. ISBN 9788497859066; translated into Spanish by Arturo Muñoz Vico.
- The Bruce Lacey Experience: Paintings, Sculptures, Installations and Performances. London: Camden Arts Centre, 2012; OCLC 830911159; with Bruce Lacey.
- Conflict, Time, Photography. London: Tate, 2014. ISBN 9781849763202; with Simon Baker and Shoair Mavlian.
- A Guide for the Protection of the Public in Peacetime. London: Archive of Modern Conflict, 2014; OCLC 909056856.
