= 2015 European Games opening ceremony =

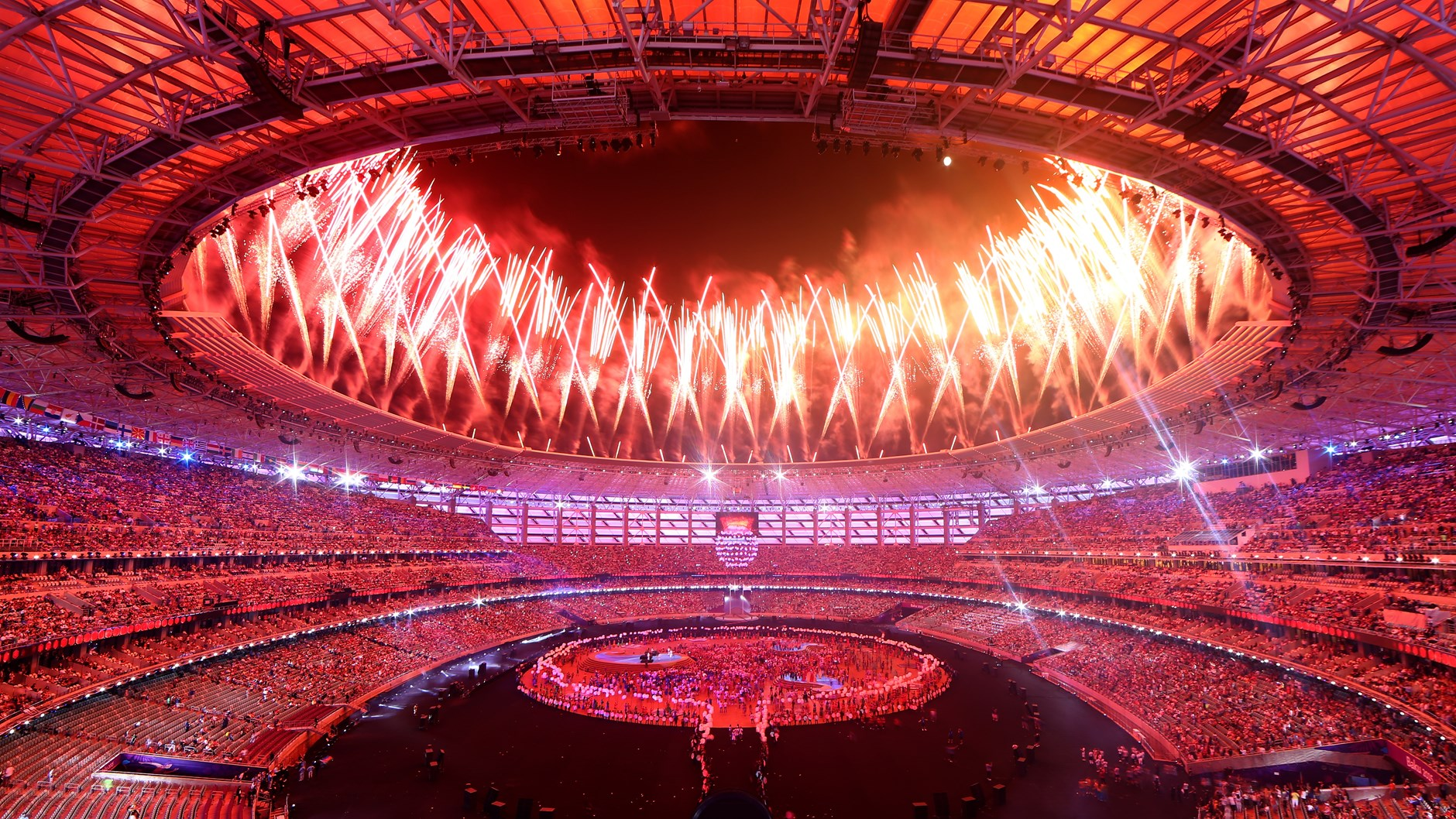
- Opening ceremony of the 2015 European Games.
- Date: 12 June 2015; 11 years ago
- Time: 21:00 - 23:09 AZT (UTC+4)
- Venue: Baku Olympic Stadium
- Location: Baku, Azerbaijan; 40.429766°N 49.91979°E
- Also known as: Origins
- Filmed by: AzTV and ISB
- Footage: The opening ceremony on YouTube

The Opening Ceremony of the 2015 European Games was the official opening ceremony held at 9:00PM Azerbaijan Time (GMT+4) on June 12, 2015, in the Baku Olympic Stadium in Baku, Azerbaijan. It was attended by the President of Azerbaijan Ilham Aliyev, the President of the International Olympic Committee, Thomas Bach, the Vice President of Azerbaijan, Mehriban Aliyeva, and the President of the European Olympic Committee Patrick Hickey. The ceremony was attended by 68,000 spectators gathered at the Olympic Stadium, as well as hundreds of millions of online viewers. More than 300 creative teams from 28 countries were involved in organizing the ceremony. The cost of organizing of the ceremony was about 100 million U.S. dollars. The opening ceremony was directed by artistic choreographer Dimitris Papaioannou who was praised for his work during the 2004 Summer Olympics.

== Ceremony ==
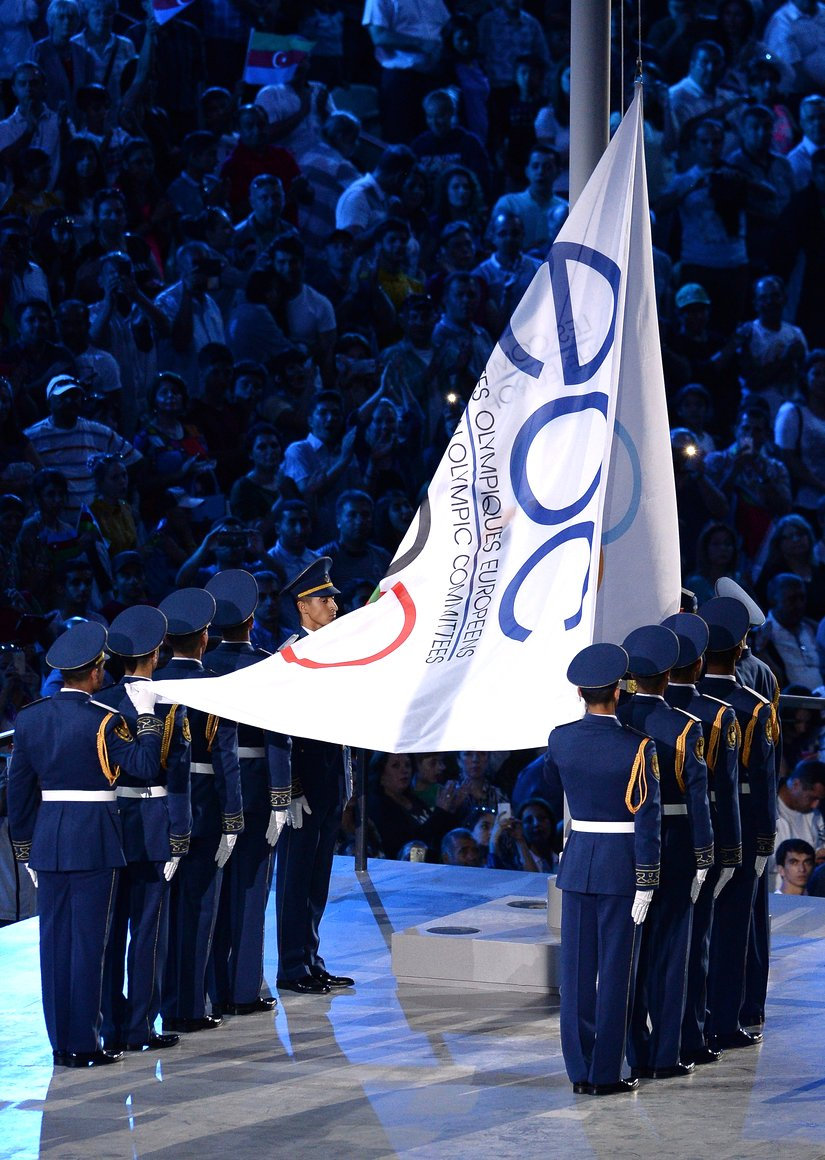
The Olympic Flag being raised by members of the Azerbaijani National Guard.

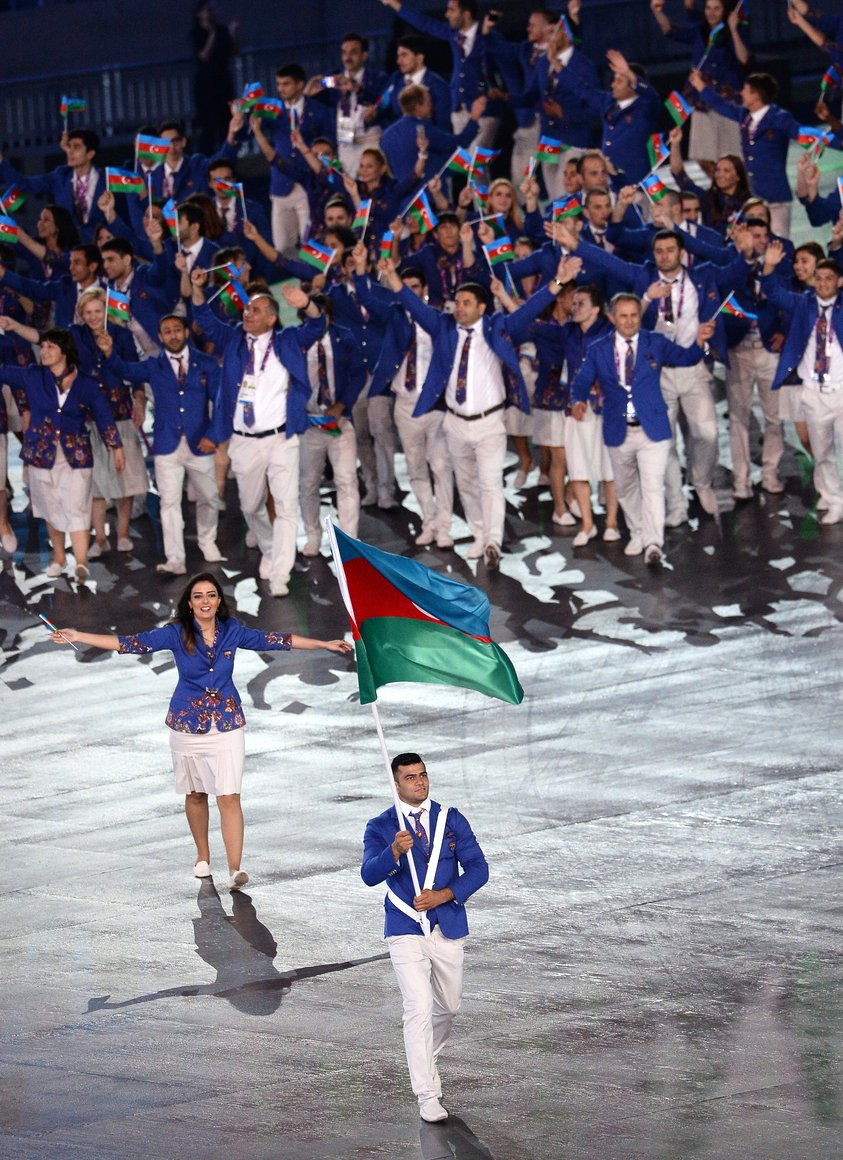
The team from Azerbaijan.

A fanfare drew attention to the Presidential Box and welcomed President of Azerbaijan Ilham Aliyev, First Lady, Chair of Baku 2015 European Games Organizing Committee Mehriban Aliyeva and President of the European Olympic Committees Patrick Hickey. The flag of Azerbaijan was carried by eight and raised by three servicemen of the National Guard of the Special State Protection Service of Azerbaijan.

The torchbearer, Ilham Zakiyev, who is an Azerbaijani blind judoka, entered the stadium and was accompanied by Said Guliyev. Zakiyev and Guliyev made their way to the center of the stadium to light the Olympic cauldron. A traditional parade of nations was then held, which was opened by Greece, and ended with the representatives of the host team, Azerbaijan. After this, the First Lady Mehriban Aliyeva delivered a speech, followed by a speech by the President of the European Olympic Committees Patrick Hickey. After Hickey's remarks, the President of Azerbaijan Ilham Aliyev declared the European Games open.

American Singer Lady Gaga performed "Imagine", a cover from John Lennon at the event. The shapeshifting scene featured the representations of Yanar Dag and the Gobustan rock carvings, in particular. The woman on the stage (Nargiz Nasirzade) and the man (Aydemir Aydemirov) embodied the arrival of spring. Two thousand artists gathered at the scene to perform the yalli dance at the end. The opening ceremony was broadcast live on the official YouTube channel of the Games.

== Attending dignitaries ==
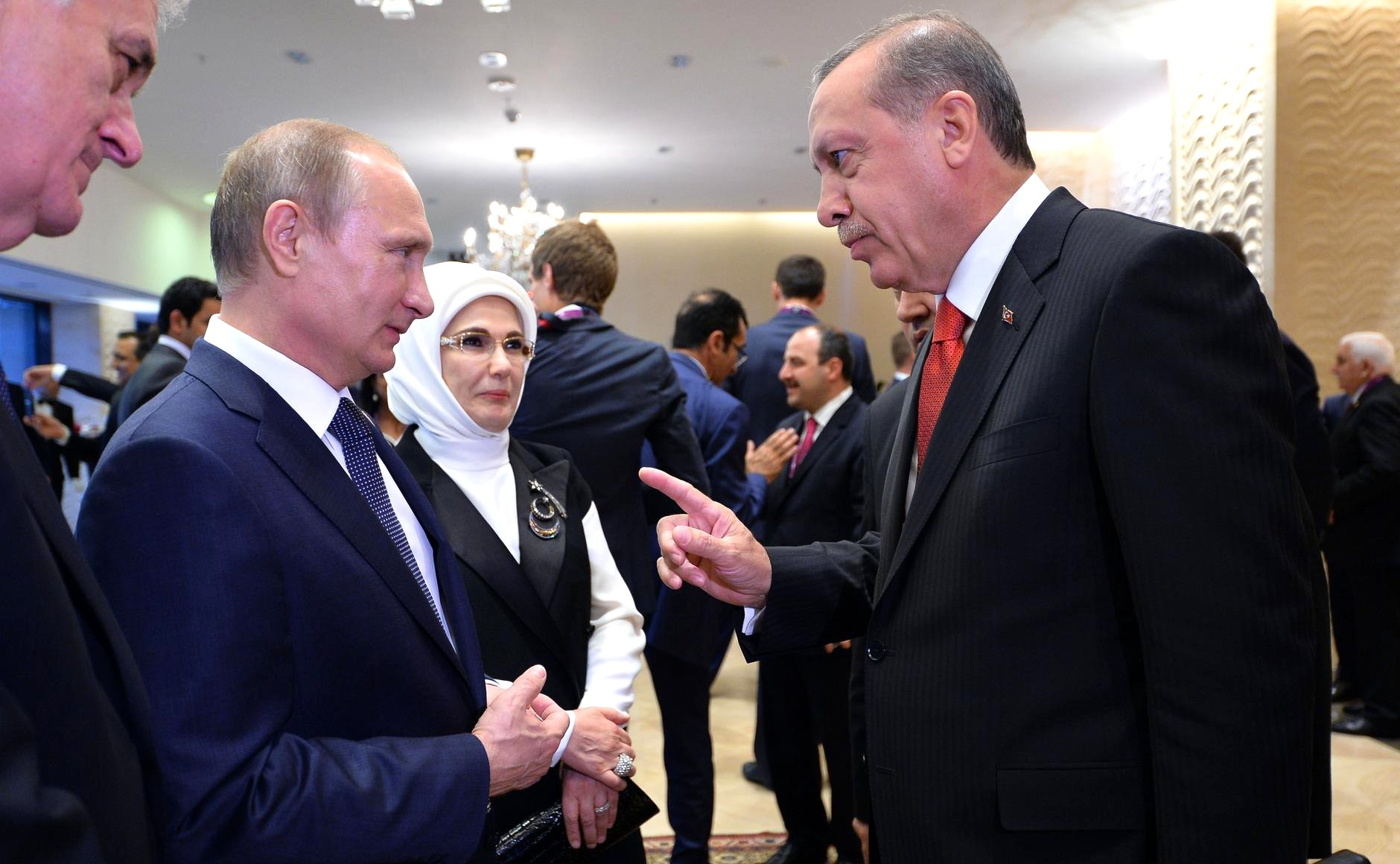
President of Turkey Recep Tayyip Erdogan with President of Russia Vladimir Putin.

- President of Turkey Recep Tayyip Erdogan
- President of Russia Vladimir Putin
- President of Serbia Tomislav Nikolic
- President of Montenegro Filip Vujanovic
- Chairman of the Presidency of Bosnia and Herzegovina Mladen Ivanic
- President of Belarus Alexander Lukashenko
- President of Turkmenistan Gurbanguly Berdimuhamedov
- President of Tajikistan Emomali Rahmon
- Henri, Grand Duke of Luxembourg
- Albert II of Monaco
- Bulgarian Prime Minister Boyko Borisov
- Prime Minister of Georgia Irakli Garibashvili
- Prime Minister of Romania Victor Ponta
- First Deputy Prime Minister of Kyrgyzstan Tayirbek Sarpashev
- Vice Speaker of the Latvian Saeima Andrey Klementyev
- President of Qatari Olympic Committee Sheikh Joaan bin Hamad bin Khalifa Al Thani
- Crown Prince of Saudi Arabia Abdullah bin Mosaad
- Former Latvian President Valdis Zatlers

== Gallery ==
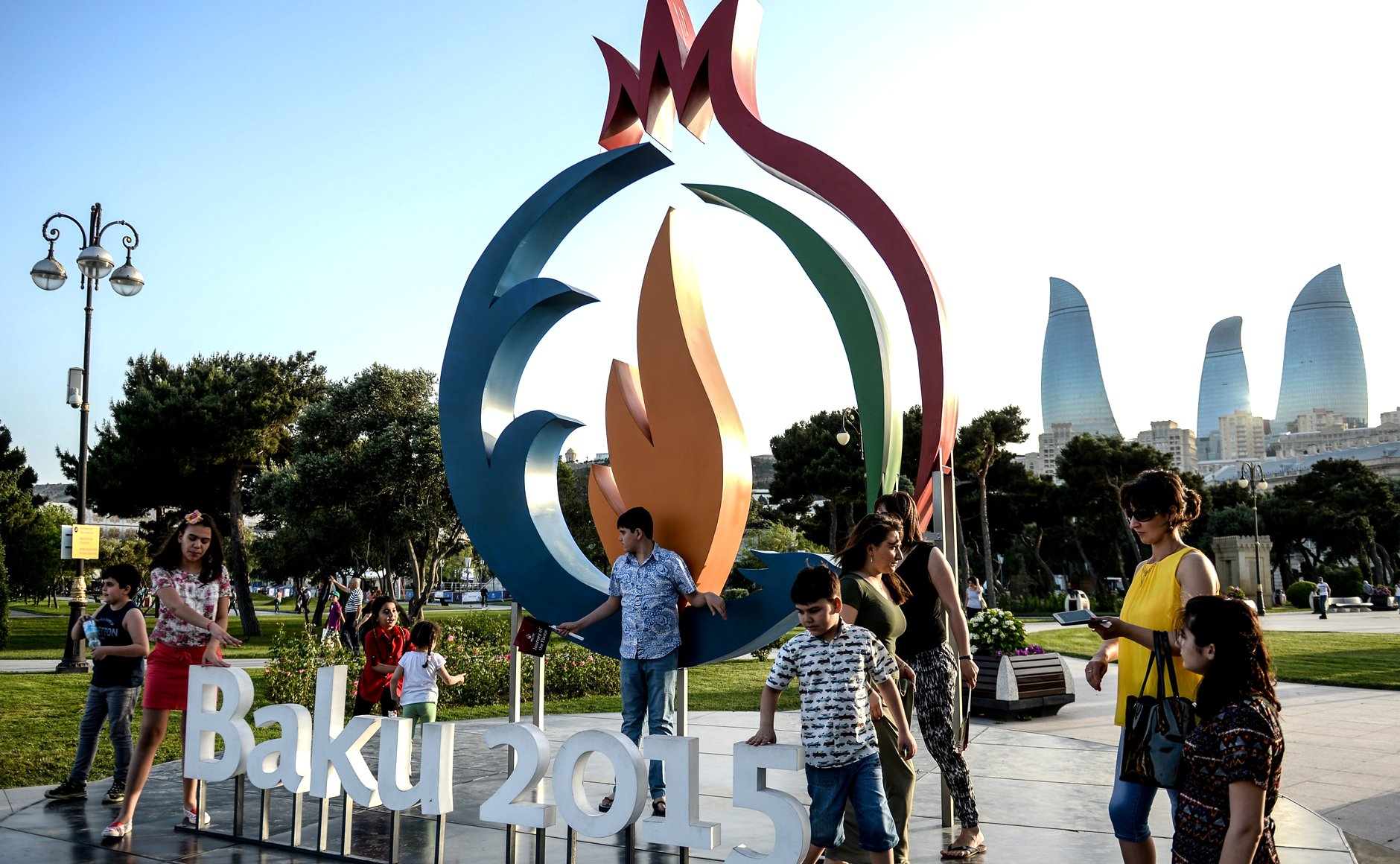
Stadium entrance

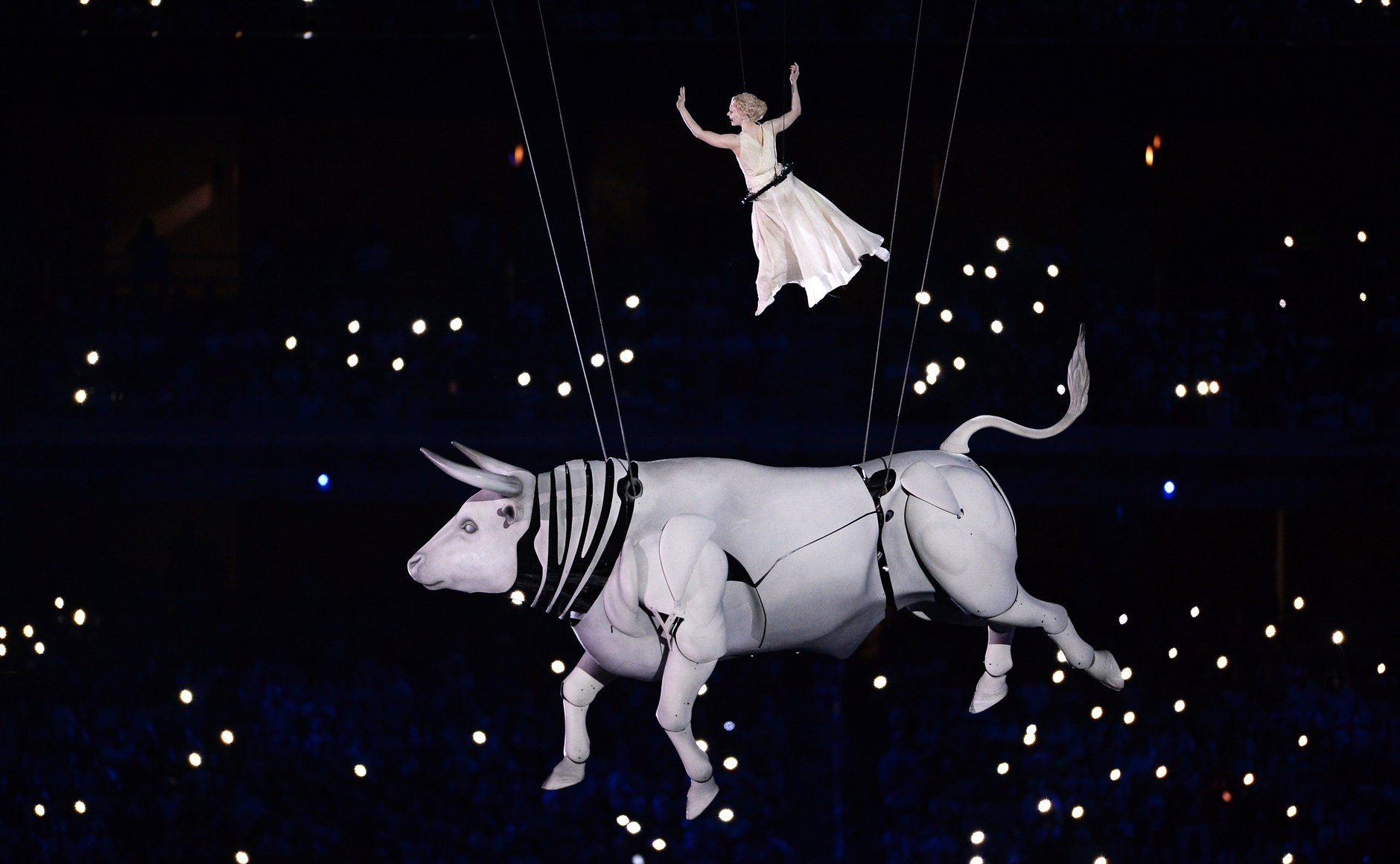
Princess Europa riding Zeus in appearance of a bull

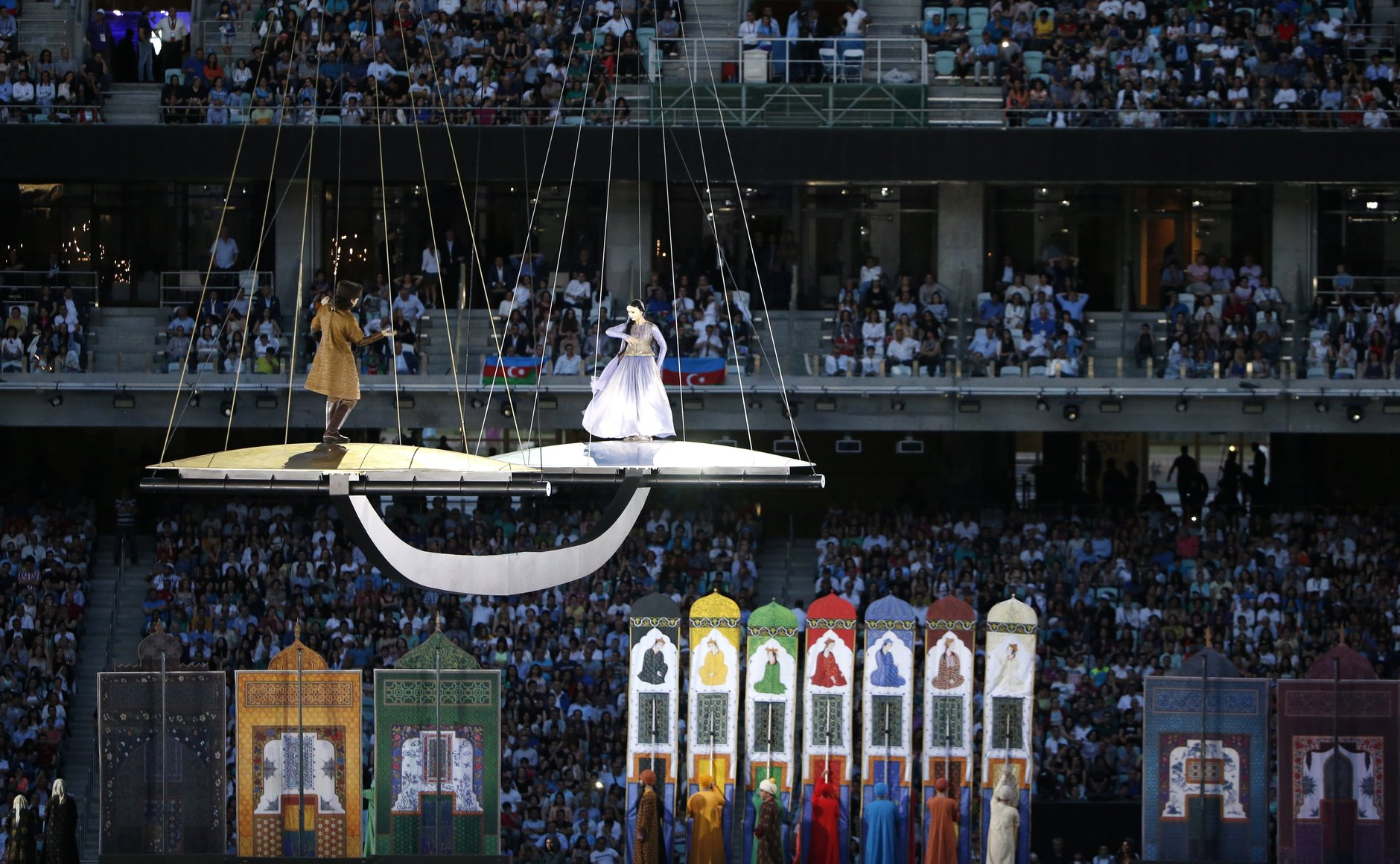
Layla and Majnun

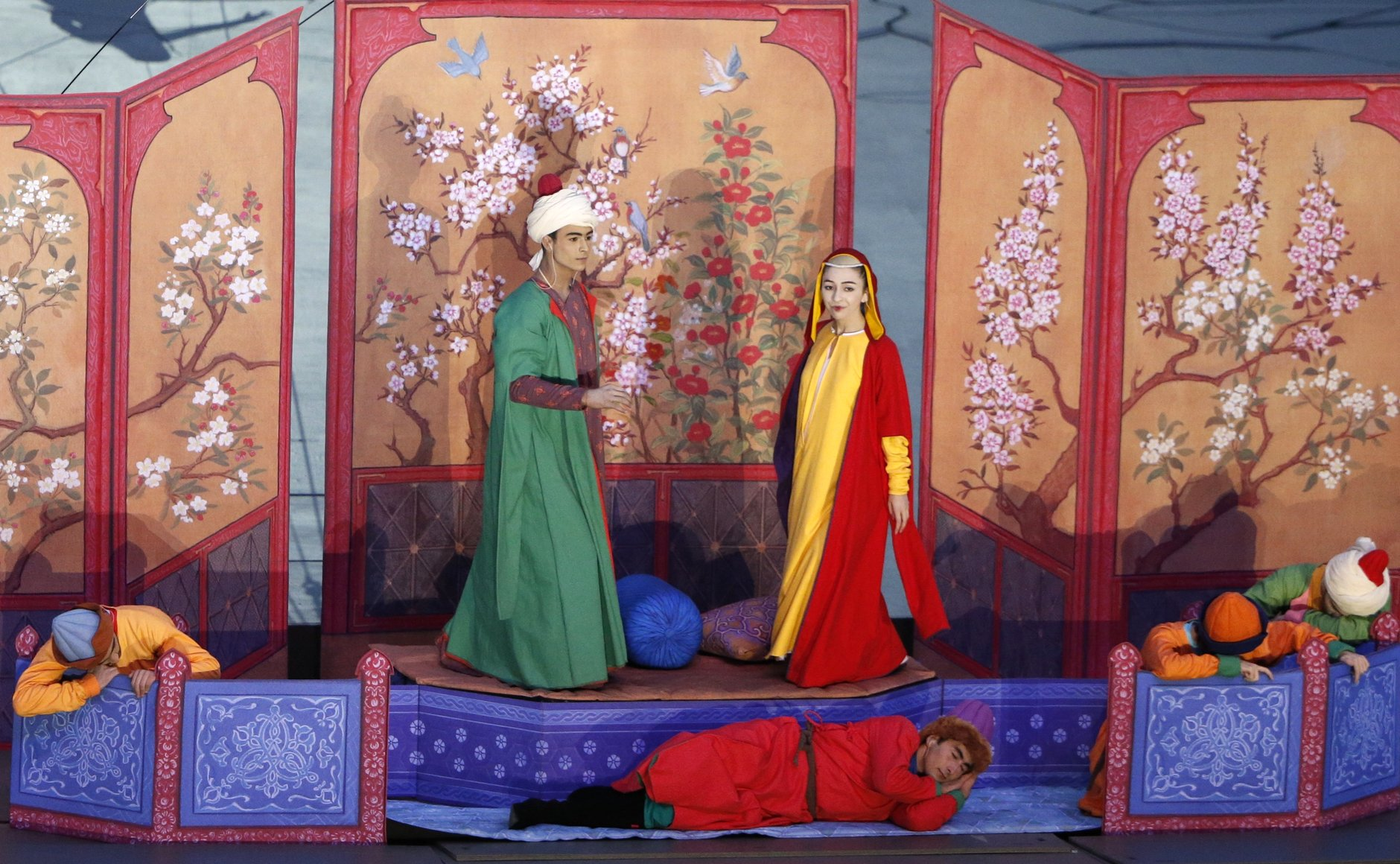
Khosrow and Shirin

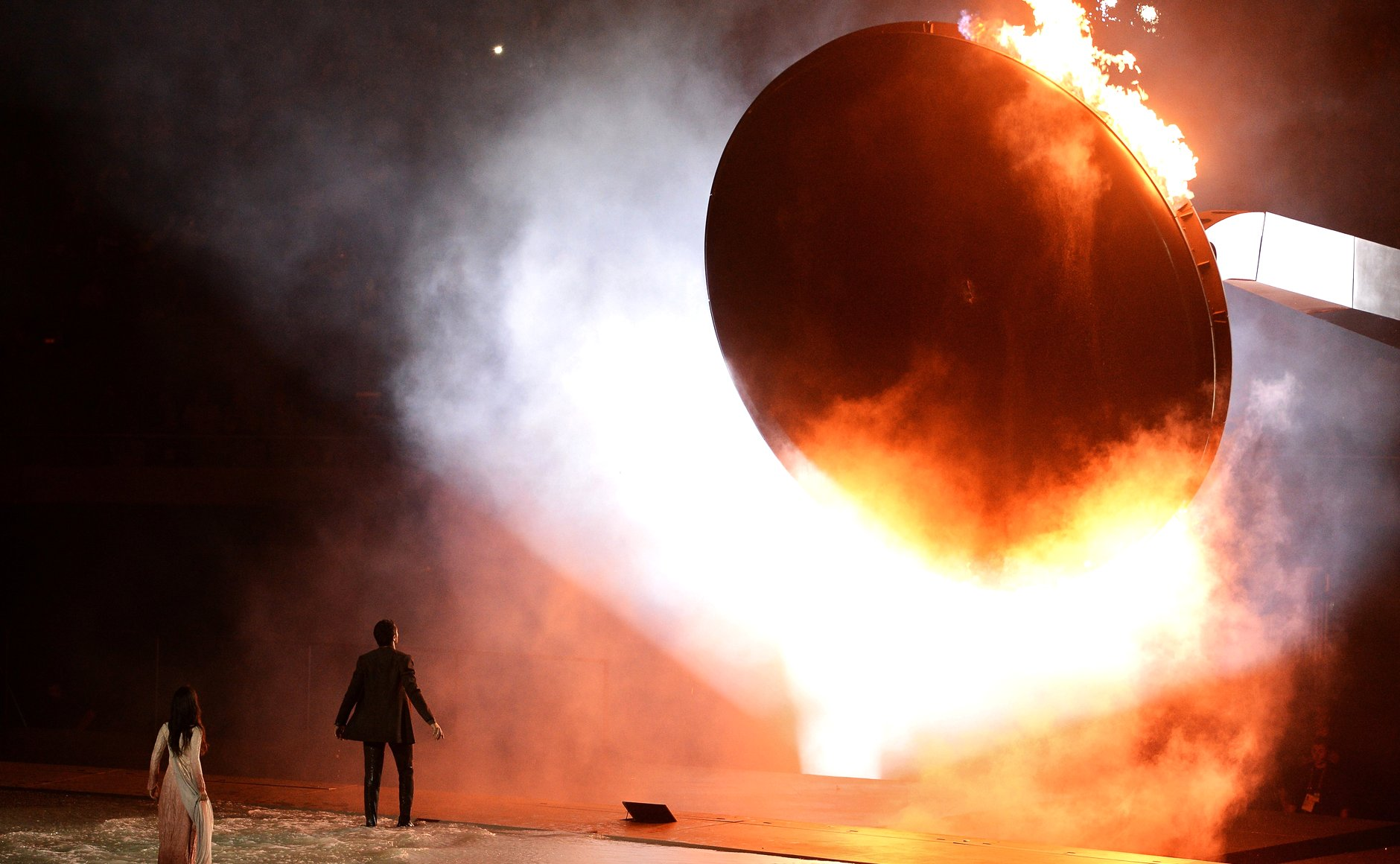
Flame

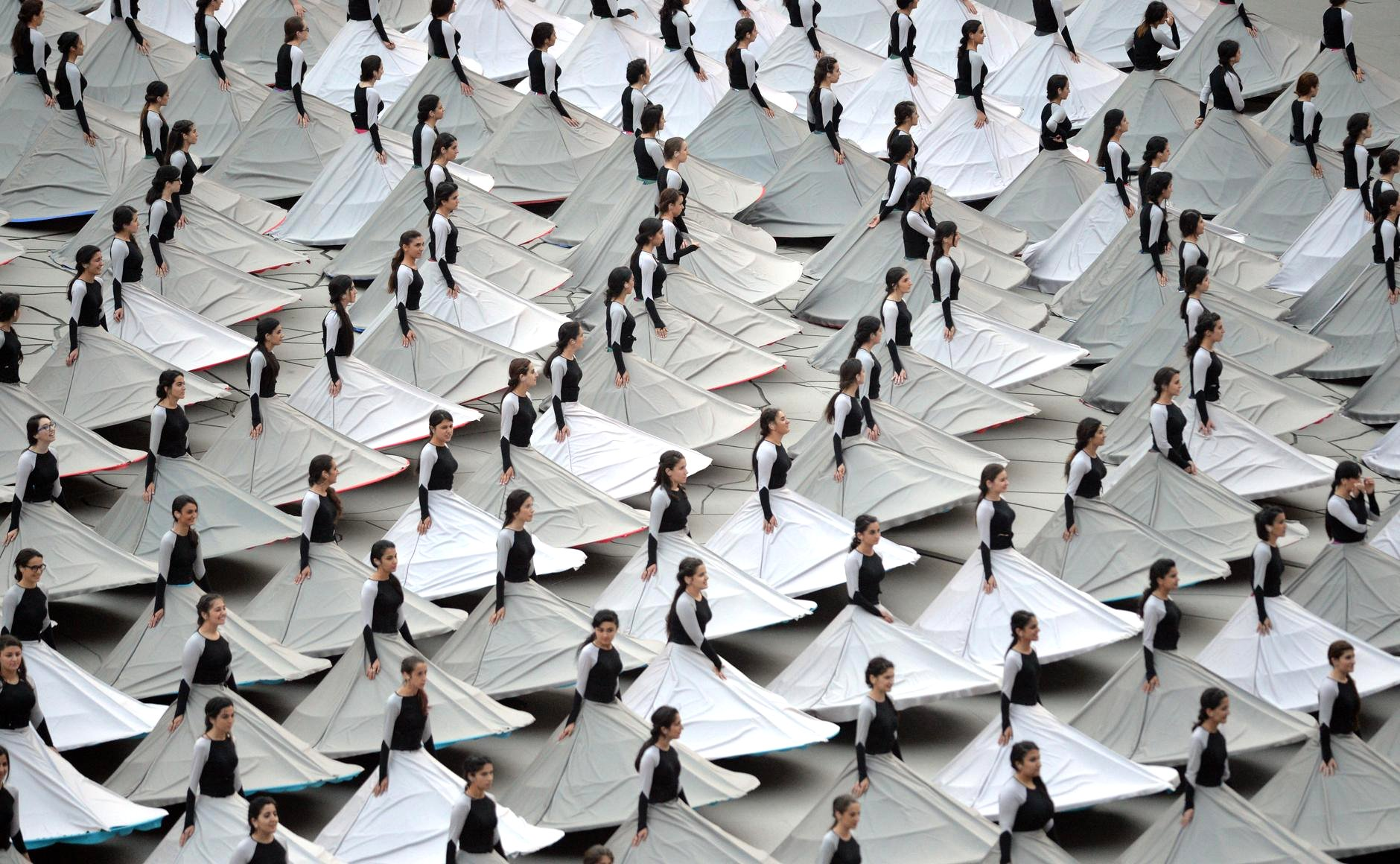
Dancers during the opening ceremony
