= Amelia Jones =

American art historian

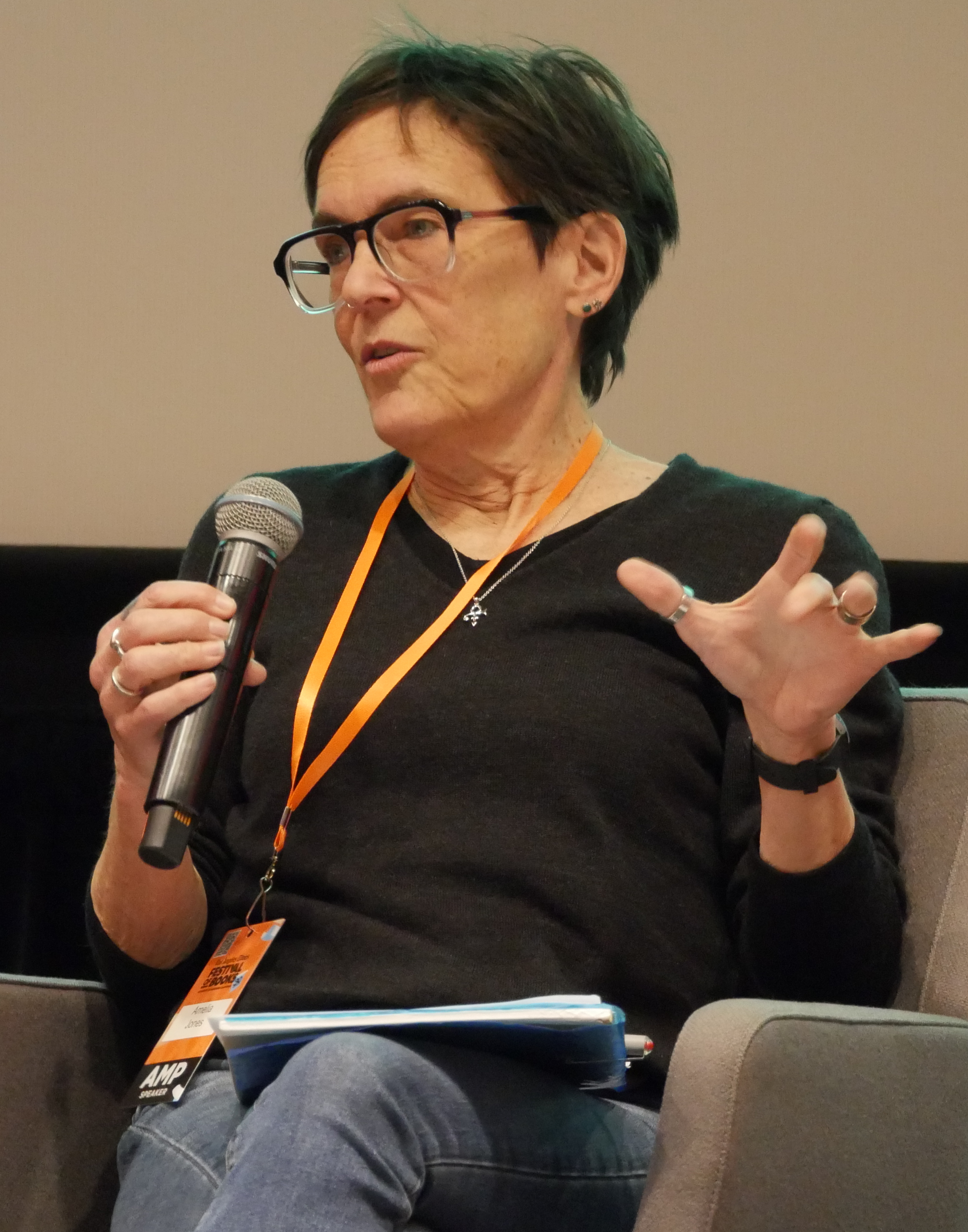
- Born: July 14, 1961 (age 65); Durham, North Carolina, United States
- Education: Harvard University; University of Pennsylvania; University of California, Los Angeles
- Employer(s): ArtCenter College of Design; University of California, Riverside; University of Manchester; McGill University; University of Southern California
- Known for: Art History and Art Theory
- Awards: Guggenheim Fellowship (2000); Distinguished Feminist Award (2015); National Endowment for the Humanities (2000-01); Fellow of American Council of Learned Societies (1994-95)

Amelia Jones (born July 14, 1961) is an American art historian, professor and curator. Her research specialisms include feminist art, body art, performance art, video art, identity politics, and New York Dada. Jones's earliest work established her as a feminist scholar and curator, including through a pioneering exhibition and publication concerning the art of Judy Chicago; later, she broadened her focus on other social activist topics including race, class and identity politics.

== Biography ==
Born in Durham, North Carolina, Jones is the daughter of Virginia Sweetnam Jones and Edward E. Jones, a Princeton psychology professor.

Jones studied art history as an undergraduate at Harvard University and completed her M.A. at the University of Pennsylvania. She received her Ph.D. from University of California, Los Angeles in 1991. Her dissertation was later turned into a published book, Postmodernism and the Engendering of Marcel Duchamp (1994).

On March 7, 1987, Jones married Anthony Sherin, a film editor. They divorced in 2005. In 2007, Jones married artist Paul Donald. She has two children from her first marriage. Jones currently resides in Los Angeles.

=== Career ===
After completing her PhD, Jones left Los Angeles to teach at universities throughout the United States as well as in Manchester, England and Montreal, Canada. She has taught art history at University of California, Riverside and the University of Manchester, where she served as the Pilkington Chair of the department.

Jones served as the Grierson Chair in Visual Culture at McGill University in Montreal and has held visiting professorships at Washington University in St. Louis, University of Colorado Boulder, Museum of Fine Arts, Houston, Texas Christian University, Maine College of Art & Design, York University, and Elam School of Fine Arts at the University of Auckland.

Jones is currently the Robert A. Day Professor and Chair of Critical Studies at the USC Roski School of Art and Design, where she also serves as Vice Dean of Research. She is affiliated faculty in the Department of American Studies and Ethnicity in the USC Dornsife College of Letters, Arts and Sciences.

In addition to her work in academia, Jones has also curated a number of exhibitions, including Sexual Politics: Judy Chicago's Dinner Party in Feminist Art History (1996) at the Hammer Museum, The Politics of Difference: Artists Explore Issues of Identity (1991) at the Chandler Art Museum at University of California, Riverside, and Material Traces: Time and the Gesture in Contemporary Art (2013) at the Leonard and Bina Ellen Gallery at Concordia University in Montreal.

Currently, Jones is independently organizing a retrospective exhibition on the work of American performance artist Ron Athey.

== Books ==
Jones is the author and editor of numerous books and anthologies on art history, performance studies, queer studies, and visual culture. She currently serves as co-editor of the Manchester University Press series Rethinking Art's Histories with Martha Meskimmon. Jones has edited A Companion to Contemporary Art since 1945, a collection of art history and criticism by contributors who write on such topics as technology, formalism, public space, diasporas, culture wars, the avant-garde, and the society of the spectacle. She has also edited The Feminism and Visual Culture Reader, the seven part work of Provocations, Representation, Difference, Disciplines/Strategies, Mass culture/Media interventions, Body, and Technology.

The following is a selection of works written or edited by Amelia Jones:

- Postmodernism and the En-Gendering of Marcel Duchamp. New York: Cambridge University Press, 1994.
- Sexual Politics: Judy Chicago's 'Dinner Party' in Feminist Art History. Berkeley: University of California Press, 1996.
- Body Art/Performing the Subject. Minneapolis: Minnesota University Press, 1998.
- Warr, Tracey and Amelia Jones (eds.). The Artist's Body. London: Phaidon, 2000.
- The Feminism and Visual Culture Reader. New York: Routledge, 2003.
- Irrational Modernism: A Neurasthenic History of New York Dada. Cambridge, Massachusetts: MIT Press, 2004.
- Self/Image: Technology, Representation, and the Contemporary Subject. New York: Routledge, 2006.
- “The Artist is Present”: Artistic Re-enactments and the Impossibility of Presence. TDR, Vol. 55, No. 1 (Spring 2011), p. 16-45. Posted Online February 16, 2011.
- Heathfield, Adrian and Amelia Jones (eds.). Perform, Repeat, Record: Live Art in History. Chicago: University of Chicago Press, 2012.
- Seeing Differently: A History and Theory of Identification and the Visual Arts. New York: Routledge, 2012.
- "Sexuality" London: Whitechapel Gallery, 2014.
- Silver, Erin and Amelia Jones (eds.). Otherwise: Imagining queer feminist art histories. Manchester: Manchester University Press, 2015.
- In between subjects: a critical genealogy of queer performance. New York: Routledge, 2021.

== Awards ==
Throughout Amelia Jones' career she has been recognized for her valuable contributions to the art world. She has also been recognized for her progressive work with feminist ideas. She was award the Distinguished Feminist Award in 2015 which honors art, scholarship, or advocacy advancing the cause of equality for women in the arts. Previous winners of the award include The Guerrilla Girls, Lucy Lippard and Lorraine O’Grady. Jones received a few awards prior that acknowledge her success as an art historian and feminist activist.

Awards Amelia Jones received:

- Distinguished Feminist Award, 2015
- National Endowment for the Humanities, 2000–01
- Guggenheim fellow, 2000.
- Fellow of American Council of Learned Societies, 1994–95

== 2015 USC MFA Controversy ==
Approximately one year after moving to USC to take the position of Vice Dean of Research at USC's Roski School of Art and Design, Jones was embroiled in a controversy regarding the school's MFA program in visual arts. Facing an administrative restructuring of the program, including significant retroactive changes in the funding initially offered to MFA candidates and the departures of then-director A.L. Steiner and faculty member Frances Stark, the entire MFA class of 2016 withdrew from the program. In October of 2015, these events were discussed in a roundtable in Artforum, which included Steiner, Stark, program faculty member Charlie White, program alumna Amanda Ross-Ho, and former MFA candidate Lee Relvas. The goal of this roundtable, in part, was to address "the drastic restructuring and reduction in funding for the school's renowned graduate program by a new dean's administration." In her role as administrator, Jones responded to what she perceived as "inaccurate claims about Roski and USC" published in this roundtable. Rebutting this response, a number of faculty, alumni, and former MFA candidate accused Jones of a series of misrepresentations and omissions. "The Roski school’s current administration," they argued, "has undermined the fabric of contemporary art practice through a consolidation of power and singularity of voice," asserting that such a process was "emblematized by Jones’s letter." By 2016, the last-remaining student in the MFA program—HaeAhn Kwon—had also dropped out. In a letter to USC Provost Michael Quick, she stated that it was "it was absurd to read the published words of Vice Dean Jones claiming the MFA program to be “alive and well” in Artforum," and referred to Jones as part of a "delusional administration."
