= Citizen: An American Lyric =

2014 poetry book by Claudia Rankine

- The cover of the American softback first edition
- Author: Claudia Rankine
- Language: English
- Publisher: Graywolf Press (US); Penguin Books (UK)
- Publication date: October 7, 2014
- Publication place: United States
- Pages: 166 (softcover)
- ISBN: 978-1-555-97690-3 (US softcover); ISBN 978-0-141-98177-2 (UK softcover)

Citizen: An American Lyric is a 2014 book-length poem and a series of lyric essays by American poet Claudia Rankine. Citizen stretches the conventions of traditional lyric poetry by interweaving several forms of text and media into a collective portrait of racial relations in the United States. The book ranked as a New York Times Bestseller in 2015 and won several awards, including the 2014 National Book Critics Circle Award for Poetry, the 2015 NAACP Image Award for Outstanding Literary Work in Poetry, and the 2015 Forward Prize for Poetry Best Collection.

In her critique of racism and visibility, Rankine details the quotidian microaggressions African-Americans face, discusses controversial incidents such as backlashes against tennis player Serena Williams, and inquires about the ramifications of the shootings of Trayvon Martin and James Craig Anderson. She draws on pop culture and intersperses her writing with images of various paintings, drawings, sculptures, and other digital media to "render visible the black experience".

== Summary ==
The book consists of seven chapters interspersed with images and artworks. The first chapter details microaggressions Rankine and her friends have experienced. The second chapter discusses the YouTube character Hennessy Youngman (created by Jayson Musson) and racial incidents in the life of Serena Williams. The third chapter features more microaggressions and the nature of racist language. In the fourth chapter Rankine writes of the transition of sighs into aches, the nature of language, memory, and watching tennis matches in silence. Chapter five is a complex poem on self-identity interspersed with more microaggressions. Chapter six is a series of scripts for "situation videos" created in collaboration with John Lucas on Hurricane Katrina, the shootings of Trayvon Martin and James Craig Anderson, the Jena Six, the 2011 England riots in the wake of the death of Mark Duggan, stop-and-frisk, Zinedine Zidane's headbutt of Marco Materazzi in the 2006 FIFA World Cup Final, and the verbal error during Barack Obama's first inauguration as President of the United States. The sixth chapter ends with "Making Room", a script for a "public fiction" about finding a seat on the subway, and a list of African-American men and women involved in recent police shooting incidents that concludes with the phrase "because white men can't police their imagination black men are dying". The seventh chapter is a complex meditation on race, the body, language and various incidents in the life of the author. The book is interspersed with images of various paintings, drawings, sculptures and screen grabs.

== Reception ==
Citizen was a New York Times best seller.

The book received reviews from The Adroit Journal, Bookforum, The Boston Review, Brevity, The Guardian, The Independent,The New York Review of Books, The New York Times,The New York Times Book Review, The New Yorker, Publishers Weekly, The Seattle Review of Books, and Slate.

Dan Chiasson, in the New Yorker, wrote that "[Citizen] is an especially vital book for this moment in time. ...The realization at the end of this book sits heavily upon the heart: 'This is how you are a citizen,' Rankine writes. 'Come on. Let it go. Move on.' As Rankine's brilliant, disabusing work, always aware of its ironies, reminds us, 'moving on' is not synonymous with 'leaving behind.'"

Booklist, Kirkus, The Oxonian Review, Shelf Awareness, and The Washington Post provided positive reviews, as well.

Kirkus called Citizen "[f]requently powerful, occasionally opaque." In The Washington Post, Michael Lindgren wrote, "Part protest lyric, part art book, Citizen is a dazzling expression of the painful double consciousness of black life in America."

The book was ranked the greatest literary work of the 2010s by Literary Hub contributors.

In a reflection ahead of its tenth anniversary, writer Lisa Teasley wrote: "Yet Citizen: An American Lyric continues to be deeply, unsettlingly relevant. It captures the unequal recognition of belonging that Black citizens in white America receive. By using second person, Rankine brings us into the feelings of invisibility and hypervisibility produced by these situations."

=== Awards and honors ===
Year	Award/Honor	Result	Ref.
2014	California Book Awards for Poetry	Finalist	
2014	NAACP Image Award for Outstanding Literary Work in Poetry	Winner	
2014	National Book Award for Poetry	Finalist	
2014	National Book Critics Circle Award for Poetry	Winner	
2014	National Book Critics Circle Award for Criticism	Finalist	
2015	Forward Prizes for Poetry Best Collection	Winner	
2015	Los Angeles Times Book Prize in Poetry	Winner	
2015	PEN Open Book Award	Winner	
2015	Zora Neale Hurston/Richard Wright Legacy Award for Poetry	Winner	
2017	Rebekah Johnson Bobbitt National Prize for Poetry	Winner	
