= Hennessy Youngman =

Hennessy Youngman is a DJ and public speaker persona invented and performed by Jayson Musson.

Youngman makes addresses to the Internet at large in online episodes of a series titled "Art Thoughtz." Most often, Youngman takes on the role of art critic or cultural critic while speaking to topics concerning art, race, gender, and popular culture. In addition, Youngman makes DJ mixtapes called "CVS Bangers" with songs interspersed with seemingly random statements and air horn blasts.

In his video monologues, Youngman becomes a tutor to an audience of hopeful artists in search of success. By explaining traditional art concepts and relating them to pop culture and real-world examples, he is able to expose issues and conflicts within contemporary art society. A scheme is perpetuated, through Youngman and the "Art Thoughtz" videos, of following an often sympathetic character, one who is apparently outside the art world, attempting to understand and permeate a seemingly exclusive cultural society. This sort of 'underdog in the art world' characterization can be seen in the work of video artist of Alex Bag or motion pictures such as the biopic Basquiat or the art world satire (Untitled).

== Development of the character ==
The assumed name, Hennessy Youngman, combines references to Henny Youngman, a comedian famous for "one-liners," and Hennessy cognac, a popular drink in the hip-hop community.

Youngman is often seen in his videos wearing a wide variety of elaborately decorated baseball caps and gold chain necklaces.

The "Art Thoughtz" project began in early 2010.

Hennessy Youngman gave a live performance of "Art Thoughtz" at The Museum of Contemporary Art Chicago on September 7, 2011 on the topic of how museums may receive millennial involvement.

On May 14, 2012, Youngman appeared as a guest critic at Ted Byfield's Major Studio final critiques.

In September 2012, "ArtInfo" magazine named "Art Thoughtz" one of the "100 Most Iconic Artworks of the Last 5 Years."

There have been no additional published works under the Hennessy Youngman alias since May 16, 2012.

== Art Thoughtz ==
=== How To Be A Successful Artist ===
In the format of an instructional video, Youngman exposes the art world as a culturally white, male-dominated environment, impenetrable to minorities.

=== How To Be A Successful Black Artist ===
Similar to "Art Thoughtz: How To Be A Successful Artist", this video by Youngman also takes the format of an instructional video. This work differentiates itself by exposing the success of black artists to be reliant on conforming to stereotypes as hyperbolically as possible in Youngman's opinion. Youngman claims the white supporters of art do not want to be able to relate to works created by people of color.

In the video, he uses a variety of images, including video footage of pit bulls fighting, video footage of Rodney King being beaten, a photograph of Emmett Till in his coffin, the scene from Spike Lee's Do the Right Thing when Radio Raheem is choked to death, Couple in The Cage: Two Undiscovered Amerindians Visit the West by artists Coco Fusco and Guillermo Gómez-Peña, a photograph called Hottentot Venus by artist Renée Cox, a screenshot of Alf from the television show ALF, a video clip of comedian Richard Pryor performing to a white audience, a photograph of former Louisiana governor Bobby Jindal, a painting called How Ya Like Me Now? of a white Jesse Jackson by the artist David Hammons, cats dressed in costumes, paintings by artist Kehinde Wiley, cut paper silhouettes by artist Kara Walker, and the painting Dogs Playing Poker.

=== Beuys-Z ===
Youngman introduces his Internet audience to the concept of "Personal Mythology" by comparing the work of artist Joseph Beuys and Jay-Z. By paralleling Beuys's story of being shot down in the Crimea when he was a fighter pilot with Jay-Z's tale surviving several shots fired at him at point-blank, among other examples, Youngman is able to establish a commonality between two otherwise disparate artists.

=== On Beauty ===
Under the premise of answering a fan's email, Youngman addresses the art and philosophy topic of aesthetics, more specifically beauty. Youngman looks at the contemporary works of Vanessa Beecroft, Leslie Tonkonow, Laurel Nakadate and Will Cotton through the analytical lens of 'beauty.' He directly contrasts the artists' works to photojournalism while disregarding possible contextual analysis through feminism or political interpretation. By applying a superficial analysis of the contemporary works through attribution, Youngman questions the current value of beauty and its role in art.

=== Grad School ===
Through the format of an infomercial, Hennessy Youngman voices his opinion on spending large sums of money to attend a graduate program for an MFA. Youngman speaks of his concern with the usefulness of art theory in the post-university job market. Youngman also comments on the usefulness of studio visits, presenting them as an inconvenience to the visitor and void of any real critique.
