= Just Us =

Just Us may refer to:

== Music ==
- Just Us, a 1970s British band led by Elton Dean
- Just Us (duo), an American pop music duo
- Just Us (Alabama album), 1987
- Just Us (JYJ album), 2014
- Just Us (Faust album), 2014
- Just Us (Roy Haynes album), 1960
- "Just Us" (DJ Khaled song), 2019
- "Just Us" (Jack Harlow song), 2025

== Other uses ==
- Just Us, Atlanta, a neighborhood of Atlanta, Georgia, U.S.
- Just Us!, a Canadian importer of fair trade coffee, tea, sugar, and chocolate
- Just Us (film), a 1986 Australian film
- Just Us (TV series), a 1992–1994 British CITV series by Kay Mellor
- Just Us: An American Conversation, a 2020 anthology by Claudia Rankine
