= Rankin County torture incident =

2023 incident of police brutality in Mississippi, U.S.

- Location: Braxton, Mississippi, U.S.
- Date: January 24, 2023
- Attack type: Police brutality, torture, shooting, home invasion, sexual assault, hate crime
- Victims: Michael Jenkins and Eddie Parker
- Perpetrators: Brett McAlpin; Christian Dedmon; Jeffrey Middleton; Hunter Elward; Daniel Opdyke; Joshua Hartfield
- Motive: Control, sadism, racism
- Verdict: Pleaded guilty
- Convictions: Federal: Deprivation of rights under color of law; Conspiracy against rights; Discharge of a firearm during a crime of violence; Obstruction of justice; Conspiracy to obstruct justice; State: All: Obstruction of justice, conspiracy to hinder prosecution Elward: Aggravated assault Dedmon, Elward: Home invasion
- Sentence: Dedmon: 40 years in prison McAlpin: 27 1/2 years in prison Elward: 20 years in prison Middleton: 17 1/2 years in prison Opdyke: 17 years in prison Hartfield: 10 years in prison

On January 24, 2023, six white law enforcement officers, five from the Rankin County Sheriff's Office and one from the Richland Police Department, tortured two black men, Michael Jenkins and Eddie Parker, at a home in Braxton, Mississippi, United States. Police were called to the home by a white neighbor who reported that Jenkins and Parker had entered the home with a white woman. The six officers, who referred to themselves as the "Goon Squad", entered the house without a warrant, then proceeded to torture Jenkins and Parker over the course of the next hour and a half. The torture included Jenkins being shot in the mouth by Hunter Elward, shattering his jaw, Parker being sexually assaulted by Daniel Opdyke, and threats of rape. The six officers were charged in both state and federal court and pleaded guilty to all charges against them.

== Background ==
Five Rankin County Sheriff's deputies and a Richland Police officer, who referred to themselves as the "Goon Squad", were involved. The five deputies were identified as Chief Investigator Brett McAlpin, Patrol Deputy Hunter Elward, Lieutenant Jeffrey Middleton, Narcotics Investigator Christian Dedmon, and Patrol Deputy Daniel Opdyke. The Richland officer was Narcotics Investigator Josh Hartfield, who was off duty at the time of the home invasion. Since 2019, the deputies had been involved with four violent encounters with black men in Rankin County that killed two and injured two others. In 2019, Elward and Dedmon were involved in the fatal shooting of Pierre Woods who police said pointed a gun at them, though a complaint claimed he had dropped it by the time he was shot. In 2021, Elward and another deputy were involved in the fatal arrest of Damien Cameron who was tased multiple times, later becoming unresponsive and dying. The Mississippi chief medical examiner wrote that Cameron's manner of death was undetermined, but three pathologists contacted by The New York Times and Mississippi Today said Cameron's death should have been ruled a homicide. A grand jury declined to press charges. Both Woods's and Cameron's families had pending lawsuits against the sheriff's office at the time of the break-in.

In 2011, Christian Dedmon's first cousin Deryl Dedmon murdered a Black man, James Craig Anderson, in a racially motivated hate crime in Jackson.

The New York Times and Mississippi Today investigated a number of brutality accusations against the Rankin County Sheriff's Office since 2004, verifying 17 of them involving 22 victims with 20 deputies present at one or more incident. Accusations against the department included ramming a stick down a man's throat until he vomited blood, choking a man with a lamp cord and waterboarding him, jabbing an off-duty sheriff's deputy for a neighboring county in the buttocks with a flashlight, testing new Tasers by shocking a man in the head and genitals, using a blowtorch to melt a nutcracker handle onto a man's bare leg before choking him with a belt, and dragging a blowtorch flame across a suspect's feet. Several people reported being stunned, having guns put in their mouths, waterboarded, and being told to move out of the county. The Goon Squad also made commemorative coins about the squad, one reading "Lt. Middleton's Goon Squad". However, federal prosecutors claimed that McAlpin was the Goon Squad's actual leader. Five claimed the deputies destroyed food in their kitchens, including smashing a man's face into a cake and pouring milk into a man's dinner. Every black accuser claimed the deputies referred to them with racial slurs.

Following the arrest of the Goon Squad, Sheriff Bryan Bailey stated he was shocked to learn of the "horrendous crimes" committed by the deputies. The New York Times report found that over a dozen people had confronted Bailey and the command staff about the deputies, including a sheriff's deputy for a neighboring county who said Bailey called him a "dirty cop" when he notified Bailey of the misconduct.

== Torture of Jenkins and Parker ==
Police were called after a report that Jenkins and Parker entered a home with a white woman. The homeowner, Kristi Walley, was a childhood friend of Parker, who had helped to care for her since she became paralyzed at age 15. At the time of the incident, she was at the hospital. It was reported that McAlpin, who was described by the victim's lawyers as the "highest man in charge" received the call and texted the other officers.

The six officers broke down the front door without a search warrant before restraining Jenkins and Parker. The officers referred to the men with racial slurs and told them to "go back to Jackson or 'their side' of the Pearl River". The deputies then beat and tased the men. After deputies found a dildo in the home, Opdyke forced it into Parker's mouth and attempted to do the same to Jenkins. Dedmon threatened to rape the men and moved to Jenkins' backside but stopped when he noticed Jenkins had defecated on himself. Elward held the two men down while Dedmon poured milk, alcohol, chocolate syrup, and cooking oil on them. Elward also threw eggs at the men. The deputies then had the two men shower to hide any evidence of abuse, with Hartfield guarding the door so they would not escape.

Police beat the two men with a wood plank and a sword. Dedmon fired several gunshots in the yard. Lastly, Elward placed his gun in Jenkins' mouth and fired, but the gun clicked. He racked the slide, and the gun fired. The bullet lacerated Jenkins' tongue and shattered his neck and jaw.

The deputies planted a gun and methamphetamine in the home and accused Jenkins of trying to shoot at officers. They also stole a hard drive from the home's security system and threw it into a river.

== Charges and sentencing ==
Jenkins and Parker initially faced false charges of drug possession, but they were dropped.

In August 2023 the six officers pleaded guilty to sixteen felonies, including civil rights conspiracy, deprivation of rights under color of law, discharge of a firearm during a crime of violence, conspiracy to obstruct justice and obstruction of justice. Dedmon, Elward, and Opdyke also pleaded guilty to three additional felonies, including deprivation of rights under color of law and discharge of a firearm in furtherance of a crime of violence, in connection with a separate incident in December 2022, in which Dedmon "beat and tased a white man and fired a gun near his head to coerce a confession, while Elward and Opdyke failed to intervene." Later that month, they pleaded guilty to state charges of obstruction of justice and conspiracy.

Sentencing for the federal charges was originally scheduled for November 14, but a judge delayed proceedings to later in the year. Sentencing was later delayed to 2024.

On March 19, 2024, deputy Hunter Elward was sentenced to 20 years in prison. The same day, Jeffrey Middleton was sentenced to 17.5 years in prison. On March 20, Christian Dedmon, who was described as a deputy, was sentenced to 40 years in prison, while deputy Daniel Opdyke received 17 years in prison. On March 21, Brett McAlpin, who was also described as a deputy, was sentenced to more than 27 years in prison. The same day, the final sentencing in the federal case was handed down, with former Richland officer Joshua Hartfield being sentenced to 10 years in prison.

On April 10, 2024, the state sentences were issued, with all sentences to run concurrently with the federal charges.

Name	Federal sentence	State sentence	Designation	Projected federal release date
Christian Dedmon	40 years	25 years	FCI Fairton (NJ)	2 September 2057
Brett McAlpin	27 years	20 years	FCI McDowell (WV)	9 June 2046
Hunter Elward	20 years	45 years	FCI McKean (PA)	13 September 2040
Jeffrey Middleton	17.5 years	20 years	FMC Devens (MA)	5 March 2038
Daniel Opdyke	17 years	20 years	FCI Ray Brook (NY)	24 March 2038
Joshua Hartfield	10 years	15 years	FCI Cumberland (MD)	15 February 2032

Dedmon was originally designated to FCI Hazelton in West Virginia. While different from USP Hazleton where Whitey Bulger was murdered, it is part of the same Federal Correctional Complex. Dedmon was transferred to FCI Fairton after only two months at Hazelton.

== Reactions ==
Jenkins and Parker filed a $400 million federal lawsuit against the sheriff's office and Rankin County Sheriff Bryan Bailey in June 2023. The lawsuit alleges Bailey failed to adequately train his deputies. Later that month, several of the deputies were either fired or resigned. The lawsuit was settled for $2.5 million on April 30, 2025.

The Rankin County NAACP chapter called for Sheriff Bailey to be removed.

== Aftermath ==
On May 2, 2025, two days after Jenkins and Parker received their $2.5 million settlement from the Rankin County Sheriff's Office, the Rankin County supervisor Steve Gaines said that the sheriff's department attorney, Jason Dare, "beat the pants off of those guys — the dopers, the people that raped and doped your daughters. He beat their pants off," during a lunch sponsored by Bailey and Bailey's former father-in-law, in reference to Jenkins and Parker. Jenkins and Parker's lawyer responded that Gaines' comments fit the racist trope that of falsely accusing black men of raping white men's daughters, and that "attitudes like this permit rogue police to prevail and allow for the conditions in which officers have been able to carry out their unlawful agenda against other citizens of the state of Mississippi". On May 5, Jenkins and Parker filed a defamation lawsuit against Gaines, stating that the supervisor's "statements were false, widely disseminated, and caused severe reputational and emotional harm".
