= Felicia Rice =

American book artist

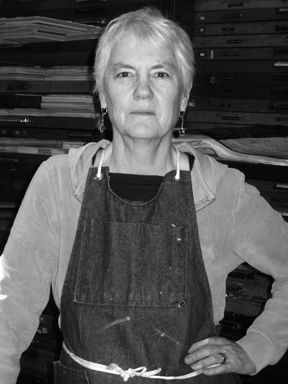
Felicia Rice at Moving Parts Press

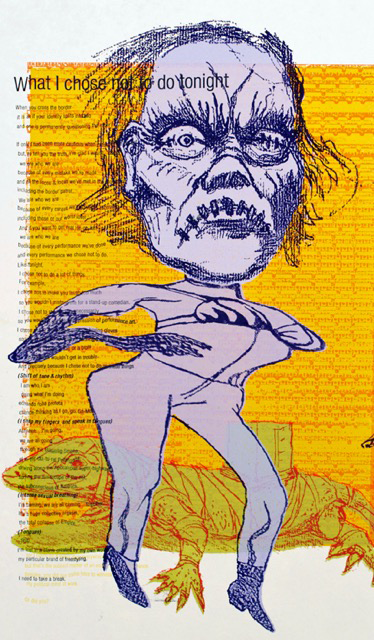
Felicia Rice, print, DOC/UNDOC: Documented Undocumented Ars Shamánica Performática (Moving Parts Press, 2014).

Felicia Rice (born 1954) is an American book artist, typographer, letterpress printer, fine art publisher, and educator. Her work is included in exhibits and collections both across the United States and internationally, and she has been the recipient of numerous awards and grants.

Rice moved to the University of California, Santa Cruz in 1974 to work with San Francisco printer Jack Stauffacher and poet/printer William Everson. Motivated to undertake nontraditional women's work and gain access to the power of the press, Rice learned to handset type, run a hot lead typecasting machine, operate old style letterpresses, and began to publish books of contemporary art and literature. Since establishing Moving Parts Press in Santa Cruz, CA in 1977, Rice has collaborated with notable writers and artists of the late 20th and early 21st centuries. She now utilizes digital technology to produce letterpress artists books and prints. The Moving Parts Press archives are held in Special Collections at the University of California, Santa Barbara.

== Early life ==
As a daughter of artist Miriam C. Rice, an author and founding faculty of the Mendocino Art Center and IMDI.htm International Mushroom Dye Institute, and artist Ray Rice, a painter, mosaicist, and animator of experimental films, Felicia grew up immersed in the modern art scene of San Francisco and Mendocino during the 1950s–60s.

Her parents’ circle included former apprentices of Diego Rivera and friends of Frida Kahlo. Rice wrote, “As a young child I would sneak into my father’s studio to study José Guadalupe Posada’s prints sensationalizing fire, murder, freakish births. I grew up in California with the legacy of the Spanish land grants, the Californios, the Mexican muralists and their saints. I am a member of a hybrid community of immigrants and artists; we use multiple languages.” As a university student in the 1970s, Rice worked with and learned from master printers Everson, Stauffacher, Adrian Wilson, and Sherwood Grover. Rice earned a BA with Highest Honors from UCSC in 1978.

== Artistic activity ==
Since 1977, Rice has published books, broadsides and prints under the Moving Parts Press imprint. These editions of new literature, works in translation, and contemporary art explore the relationship of word and image, typography and the visual arts, the fine arts, politics and popular culture. Since 1991, the Press's editorial focus has been on Latinx arts and literature.

Commenting on Rice's work, Guillermo Gómez-Peña wrote, “Felicia is not just a book artist. She is also what insiders call a 'letterpress printer,' which means that she masterfully utilizes raised metal type and combines it with new digital tools. In this sense Felicia’s praxis extends from ancient book making techniques all the way to cyber-art. Her collaborative projects create book structures in which word and image meet and merge into a total experience."

Through the process of developing the artists’ book, DOC/UNDOC, Rice experienced a self-transformation that led to an ongoing exploration of the book artist as performance artist.

=== Major collaborations ===
- 2015–2019: Borderbus is a rendering of one long poem by Juan Felipe Herrera, a whispered conversation between two women held on an ICE bus at the US border. This limited edition artists’ book features prints by the artist/publisher, readings of the poem, and an introduction by Carmen Giménez Smith.
- 2007–2014: DOC/UNDOC Documentado/Undocumented Ars Shamánica Performática, containing the book DOC/UNDOC, is Rice's second collaboration with performance artist/writer Gómez-Peña and art historian Jennifer A. González. The multimedia work includes contributions by video artist Gustavo Vazquez and sound artist/engineer Zachary Watkins. DOC/UNDOC features Gómez-Peña's performance texts and Rice's relief prints and typography, accompanied by González's critical commentary. It is housed in a hi-tech aluminum case containing a DVD, an altar, and a cabinet of curiosities. Opening the box and handling the objects within trigger Watkins' sound art.
- 1993–1998: Codex Espangliensis: From Columbus to the Border Patrol is an artists’ book which chronicles and confronts the realities and surrealities of border culture on the eve of the millennium. Rice's book work combines original art by painter and collage artist Enrique Chagoya with performance texts by Gómez-Peña.

=== Notable publications ===
- The Long Distance: A letterpress book of seventeen poems by San Francisco poet, Beau Beausoleil, illustrated by Rice's four prints.
- Five Hymns to Pain: Dedicated to the literary and intellectual community of al-Mutanabbi Street, an old and established center for bookselling in the heart of Baghdad, this book was produced for the al-Mutanabbi Street Project. The poem was written by one of the most influential contemporary female Iraqi poets, Nazik al-Malaika, in an English translation by Hasain Haddawy.
- El Alfabeto Animado / The Lively Alphabet / Uywakunawan Qelqasqat: This project grew out of a dream, and is the fourth book in the Literatura Chicana/Latina Series. It is an alphabet book in Spanish, English, and Quechua, populated by hand-knit finger puppets set in scenes drawn and printed at Moving Parts Press on a rainbow of cloth from Cuzco, Peru.
- Cosmogonie intime / An Intimate Cosmogony: A sequence of five long poems in French and English with pochoir imagery throughout. Poems by Yves Peyre; translation by Elizabeth R. Jackson; drawings by Ray Rice; and bookwork by Felicia Rice.
- De amor oscuro / Of Dark Love: Poems: text by Francisco X. Alarcón, drawings by Ray Rice.

=== Selected collections, exhibitions, and performances ===
Rice's limited edition artists' books, broadsides, and prints can be found in Special Collections at Stanford's Cecil H. Green Library; Victoria & Albert Museum in London; the Bodleian Library at Oxford; Rare Books and Manuscripts at the New York Public Library; the Whitney Museum of American Art in New York; Bancroft Library at University of California at Berkeley; Special Collections at University Library at University of California-Santa Cruz; Special Collections at the University of Iowa; the Getty Museum; Yale University Art Gallery; and the Library of Congress in Washington, D.C.

Recent exhibitions featuring Rice's work include "Artists and Their Books, Books and Their Artists" at the Getty Research Institute (2018); the Codex International Book Fair (2017); a solo exhibition at Special Collections, University of Iowa (2016); the Segundo Concurso de Internacional de Libro Artista in Guadalajara, Mexico (2014); "The Art of the Book in California: Five Contemporary Presses" at the Cantor Arts Center at Stanford University, in Washington, D.C., and at several sites in Mexico; and "Obsidian Mirror-Travels: Refracting Ancient Mexican Art and Archeology,” at the Getty Research Institute (2011).

Rice has performed her spoken word pieces at the University of Iowa (2016); the University of Southern California and the University of California, Irvine (2015); the Galería de la Raza (2015); Michigan State University (2014); and the Mary Porter Sesnon Gallery at her alma mater UC-Santa Cruz (2014).

Rice is featured in the PBS documentary series Craft in America, first aired nationwide in the US in December 2018.

== Teaching ==
Rice taught book arts at University of California, Santa Cruz for fourteen years; she then became the director of the UCSC Extension graphic design program until 2004. She managed UCSC's Digital Arts and New Media MFA Program until 2017. Rice has been a speaker at international conferences and book arts centers.

== Selected bibliography ==
Baca, Damián. Mestiz@ Scripts: Digital Migrations and the Territories of Writing. Palgrave Macmillan, 2008.

Bellm, Dan. “Chants Encounter: Francisco X. Alarcón’s Aztec Way of Knowledge.” Village Voice (Oct. 27, 1992): 73–74.

Braun, Janice. “Codex Espangliensis: From Columbus to the Border Patrol.” Parenthesis (Apr. 4, 2000): 33–34.

Buckley, Jennifer. Review of DOC/UNDOC: Documentado/Undocumented Ads Shamánica Performática, TDR: The Drama Review 62, no. 3 (Fall 2018, T239): 179–81.

Drucker, Johanna. The Next Word: Text and/as Image and/as Design and/as Meaning. Neuberger Museum of Art, 1998: 11.

Goodman, Richard. "Fine Presses: Moving Parts Press." Fine Books & Collections (Jan./Feb. 2006): 26–27.

Gómez-Peña, Guillermo. Rydell 2008-2009 Visual Arts Fellows. The Museum of Art and History, 2009: 40–54.

Hamill, Sam. “Contemporary Poetry.” Bookways (Oct. 1992): 38–41.

Jury, David. Letterpress: New Applications for Traditional Skills. RotoVision SA, 2006: 15

Koch, Peter, ed. The Art of the Book in California: Five Contemporary Presses. Stanford University Libraries, 201: 37–41, 69–76.

Lyons, Pilar. “Fine Print/Limited Editions: Codex Espangliensis.” Bloomsbury Review (Nov./Dec. 1998).

Maclay, Catherine. “Three Exhibits Show Divergence of Two Worlds.” San Jose Mercury News (Aug. 23, 1998): 12G+.

Masri, Isaac, Julieta Sarfati, Fernano Ondarza, Peter Koch, Robert Trujillo, and Allison Roth, curators. Angel Palou, Pedro, Robert Bringhurst, and Peter Koch, essays. Libros de artista: exposition. Codex Mexico, 2012: 30–31, 43, 45, 65–69.

Peyré, Yves. Peinture et poesie: Le dialogue par le livre 1874–2000. Gallimard, 2001: 56, 225.

Salamony, Sandra, Peter Thomas, and Donna Thomas. 1000 Artists' Books: Exploring the Book as Art. Quarry Books, 2012: 97.

Sarles, Curtis. “Arts & Culture: The Muse of Santa Cruz.” City on a Hill Press (May 8, 1997).

Stegner, Lynn. "The Art of the Book." Santa Fe Trend (Winter/Spring 2006): 84–85.

Whitson, Carolyn. “Feminist Bookshelf: The Uses of Poetry.” La Gazette (Jun. 1992).

“Working Proof: Reviews of Prints, Photographs & Multiples, Guillermo Gómez-Peña and Enrique Chagoya, Codex Espangliensis: From Columbus to the Border Patrol (1998).” Art on Paper (Jan./Feb. 1999): 52.
