= Claudia Rankine =

Jamaican-American poet, essayist, and playwright (born 1963)

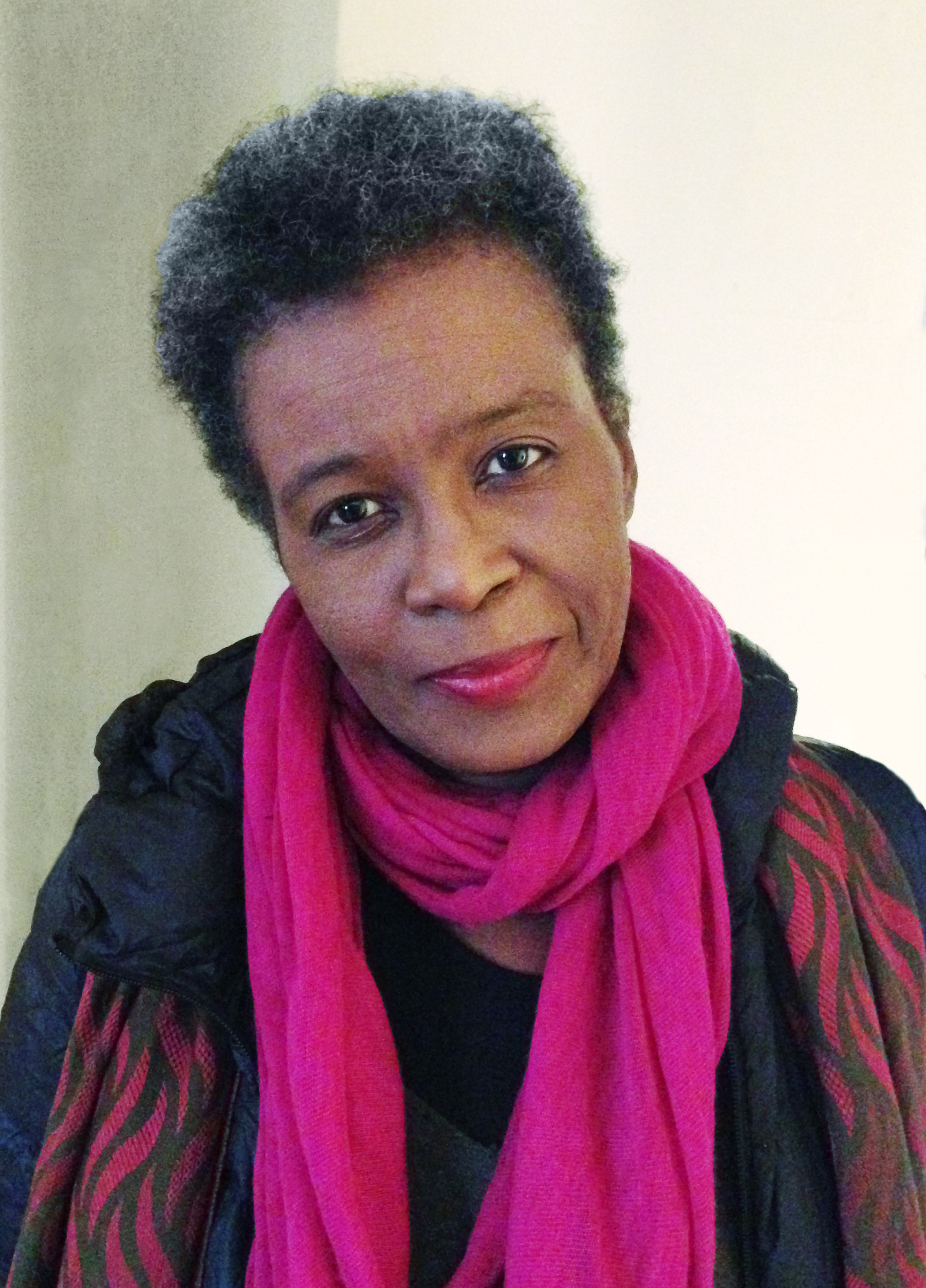
- Rankine in 2016
- Born: September 4, 1963 (age 63); Kingston, Jamaica
- Education: Williams College (BA); Columbia University (MFA)
- Occupation: Professor
- Spouse: John Lucas
- Writing career
- Genres: Poetry; Playwright
- Notable awards: MacArthur Fellow
- Website: claudiarankine.com

Claudia Rankine (/ˈræŋkɪn/; born September 4, 1963) is a Jamaican-American poet, essayist, playwright, and the editor of several anthologies. She is the author of five volumes of poetry, two plays and various essays.

Her book of poetry, Citizen: An American Lyric, won the 2014 Los Angeles Times Book Award, the 2015 National Book Critics Circle Award in Poetry (the first book in the award's history to be nominated in both poetry and criticism), the 2015 Forward Prize for Best Collection, the 2015 Hurston/Wright Legacy Award in Poetry, the 2015 NAACP Image Award in poetry, the 2015 PEN Open Book Award, the 2015 PEN American Center USA Literary Award, the 2015 PEN Oakland-Josephine Miles Literary Award, and the 2015 VIDA Literary Award. Citizen was also a finalist for the 2014 National Book Award and the 2015 T. S. Eliot Prize. It is the only poetry book to be a New York Times bestseller in the nonfiction category.

Rankine's numerous awards and honors include the 2014 Morton Dauwen Zabel Award from the American Academy of Arts and Letters, the 2014 Jackson Poetry Prize, and the 2014 Lannan Foundation Literary Award. In 2005, she was awarded the Academy Fellowship for distinguished poetic achievement by the Academy of American Poets. In 2013, she was elected a Chancellor of the Academy of American Poets. She is a 2016 United States Artist Zell Fellow and a 2016 MacArthur Fellow. In 2020, she was elected a Fellow of the American Academy of Arts and Sciences.

Rankine has taught at Pomona College and was the Frederick Iseman Professor of Poetry at Yale University. In 2021, she joined the New York University Creative Writing Program as a Professor.

== Life and work ==
Claudia Rankine was born in Kingston, Jamaica, and later immigrated to the United States during childhood. After growing up in New York City, she was educated at Williams College and Columbia University.

In 2003, Rankine started work as an associate professor at the University of Georgia.

She taught English at Pomona College from 2006 to 2015.

Her work has appeared in many journals, including Harper's, GRANTA, the Kenyon Review, and the Lana Turner Journal, and she is a contributor to New Daughters of Africa, edited by Margaret Busby. Rankine co-edits (with Juliana Spahr) the anthology series American Women Poets in the 21st Century: Where Lyric Meets Language.

Winner of an Academy of American Poets fellowship, Rankine's work Don't Let Me Be Lonely (2004), an experimental project, has been acclaimed for its unique blend of poetry, essay, lyric and television imagery. Of this volume, poet Robert Creeley wrote: "Claudia Rankine here manages an extraordinary melding of means to effect the most articulate and moving testament to the bleak times we live in I've yet seen. It's master work in every sense, and altogether her own."

Rankine's play The Provenance of Beauty: A South Bronx Travelogue, commissioned by The Foundry Theatre, was a 2011 Distinguished Development Project Selection in the American Voices New Play Institute at Arena Stage.

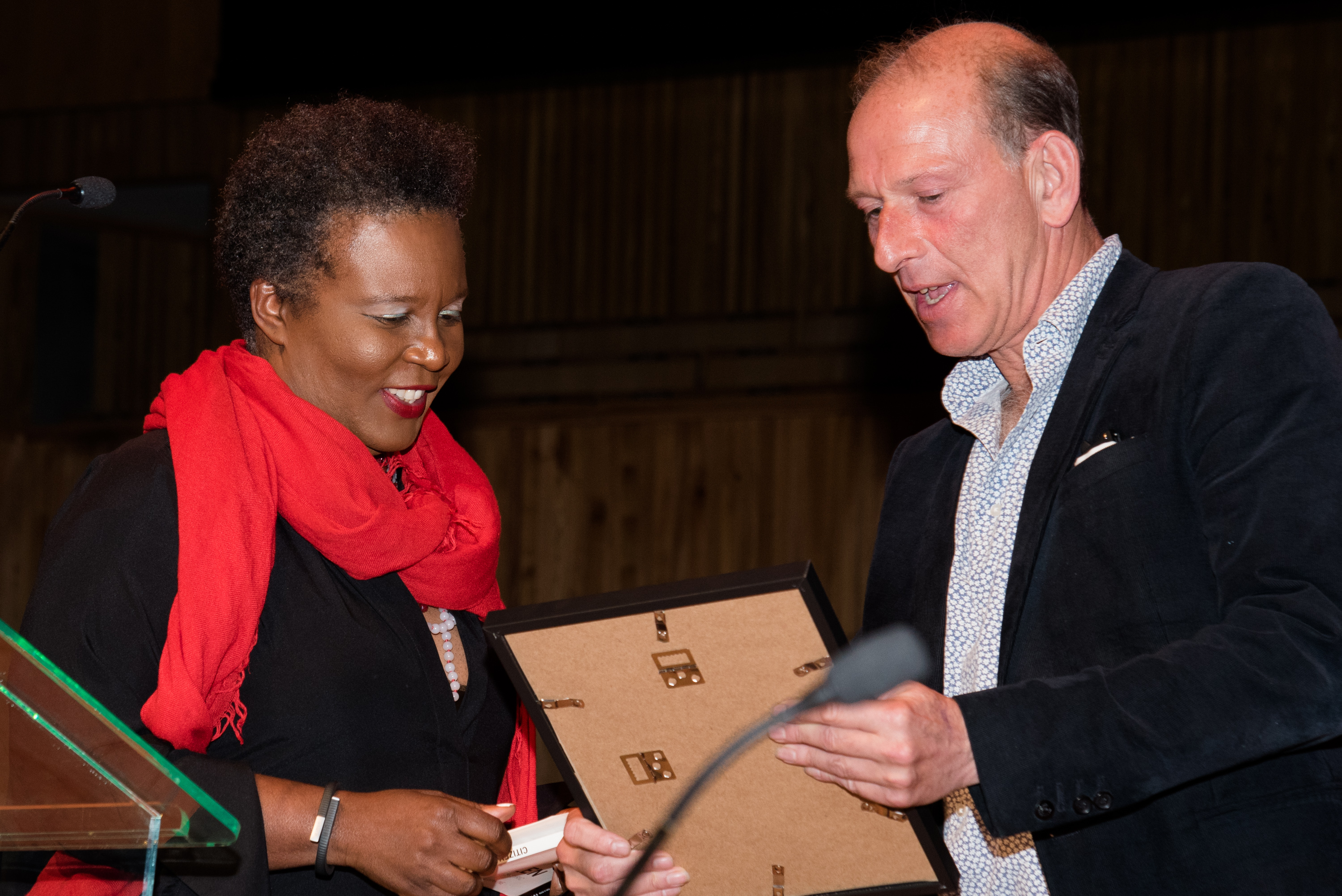
Rankine receives the Forward Prize for Poetry in 2015.

In 2014, Graywolf Press published her book of poetry Citizen: An American Lyric. Kamran Javadizadeh dissects this book, particularly Rankine's allusion to Robert Lowell's Life Studies. He writes that Citizen takes a new angle on and recognizes Lowell's whiteness, a subject of interest for Rankine.

"Not long ago you are in a room where someone asks the philosopher Judith Butler what makes language hurtful. You can feel everyone lean in. Our very being exposes us to the address of another, she answers. We suffer from the condition of being addressable. Our emotional openness, she adds, is carried by our addressability. Language navigates this.

For so long you thought the ambition of racist language was to denigrate and erase you as a person. After considering Butler's remarks you begin to understand yourself as rendered hyper-visible in the face of such language acts. Language that feels hurtful is intended to exploit all the ways that you are present. Your alertness, your openness, your desire to engage actually demand your presence, your looking up, your talking back as insane as it is, saying please."

— Claudia Rankine

Rankine also works on documentary multimedia pieces with her husband, photographer and filmmaker John Lucas. These video essays are titled Situations.

Of her work, poet Mark Doty wrote: "Claudia Rankine's formally inventive poems investigate many kinds of boundaries: the unsettled territory between poetry and prose, between the word and the visual image, between what it's like to be a subject and the ways we're defined from outside by skin color, economics, and global corporate culture. This fearless poet extends American poetry in invigorating new directions."

In 2022, Rankine's play Help: A New Play debuted at The Shed in New York City, directed by Taibi Magar. Following this commission, Rankine joined The Shed's Board of Directors.

In a 2023 review in The Guardian of her 2001 collection Plot, critic Kate Kellaway wrote: "It is a bracing, discomfiting and complicated read partly because it breaks a taboo. It is often oppressively assumed that women will necessarily rejoice at pregnancy but this work involves a complicated dredging of doubt, an examination of the visceral and cerebral burden of pregnancy, a deliberate losing of the 'plot' (the word encompassing several meanings)."

Rankine additionally founded and curates the Racial Imaginary Institute, which she called "a moving collaboration with other collectives, spaces, artists, and organizations towards art exhibitions, readings, dialogues, lectures, performances, and screenings that engage the subject of race."

In 2017, Rankine collaborated with choreographer and performer Will Rawls to generate the work What Remains. Collaborators included Tara Aisha Willis, Jessica Pretty, Leslie Cuyjet, and Jeremy Toussaint-Baptiste. The work premiered at Bard College, and has been performed at national venues, including Danspace in New York, the Walker Art Center, Yale Repertory Theatre, and Chicago's Museum of Contemporary Art Warehouse Space. In an interview with Rawls, Rankine described how text and language were manipulated in the performance: "As a writer, you spend a lot of time trying to get all of these words to communicate a feeling or to communicate an action, and to be able to get rid of the words but still hold the feeling was stunning to me."

=== The Racial Imaginary Institute ===
The Racial Imaginary Institute (TRII) is an interdisciplinary collective established in 2017 by Rankine using funds from her 2016 MacArthur Grant. TRII is a think tank for artists and writers who study whiteness and examine race as a construct. Its mission is to convene "a cultural laboratory in which the racial imaginaries of our time and place are engaged, read, countered, contextualized and demystified."

Rankine envisions the organization as occupying a physical space in Manhattan; until that is possible, the institute is roving. In 2017, the Whitney Museum presented "Perspectives on Race and Representation: An Evening With the Racial Imaginary Institute" to address the debate sparked by Dana Schutz’s painting Open Casket. In the summer of 2018, TRII presented "On Whiteness," an exhibition, symposium, library, residencies, and performances, at The Kitchen in New York.

== Awards and honors ==
- 1994: Cleveland State Poetry Prize for Nothing in Nature is Private.
- 2005: Academy Fellowship from the Academy of American Poets for distinguished poetic achievement
- 2014: National Book Critics Circle Award (Poetry) winner for Citizen: An American Lyric
- 2014: National Book Critics Circle Award (Criticism) finalist for Citizen: An American Lyric
- 2014: California Book Awards Poetry Finalist for Citizen: An American Lyric
- 2014: Jackson Poetry Prize (awarded by Poets & Writers)
- 2015: PEN Open Book Award for Citizen
- 2015: PEN Center USA Poetry Award: for Citizen: An American Lyric
- 2015: New York Times Bestseller for Citizen: An American Lyric
- 2015: Los Angeles Times Book Prize in Poetry for Citizen: An American Lyric
- 2015: NAACP Image Award for Outstanding Literary Work in Poetry for Citizen: An American Lyric
- 2015: Forward Prize for Citizen: An American Lyric
- 2016: MacArthur Fellowship.
- 2016 United States Artist Zell Fellowship.
- 2016: Bobbitt National Prize for Poetry for Citizen: An American Lyric
- 2017: Colgate University, Honorary Doctor of Letters, May 21, 2017.
- 2017: John Simon Guggenheim Fellowship for poetry
- 2020: Elected a Fellow of the American Academy of Arts and Sciences
- 2021: Elected a Royal Society of Literature International Writer

== Selected publications ==
- —— (1994). Nothing in Nature Is Private. Cleveland State University Poetry Center. ISBN 9781880834091.
- —— (1998). The End of the Alphabet. Grove Press. ISBN 9780802198532.
- —— (2001). Plot. Grove Press. ISBN 9780802198525.
- —— (2004). Don't Let Me Be Lonely: An American Lyric. Graywolf Press. ISBN 9781555974077.
- —— (2014). Citizen: An American Lyric. Graywolf Press. ISBN 9781555973483.
- —— (2019). The White Card: A Play. Graywolf Press. ISBN 9781555978396.
- —— (2020). Just Us: An American Conversation. Allen Lane. ISBN 9780241467107.
- —— (2026). Triage. Minneapolis, Minnesota: Graywolf Press. ISBN 978-1-64445-400-8.

== See also ==
- American poetry
- Caribbean literature
- Caribbean poetry

== Related media ==
External videos
- Interview w/Tavis Smiley, December 8, 2014; c. 15 minutes.
- Book Discussion on Citizen: An American Lyric, C-SPAN, April 19, 2015

- Official website
- Claudia Rankine, Poet – at Blue Flower Arts
- Claudia Rankine poems, essays, and interviews at Poets.org
- Claudia Rankine, "'The Condition of Black Life Is One of Mourning'", The New York Times, June 22, 2015
- Claudia Rankine, "The Meaning of Serena Williams", The New York Times, August 25, 2015
- Claudia Rankine, Amiri Baraka's 'S O S', The New York Times Book Review, February 11, 2015
- Claudia Rankine, Interview with Lauren Berlant in Bomb magazine, Issue 129, October 1, 2014
- Paula Cocozza, "Poet Claudia Rankine: 'The invisibility of black women is astounding'", The Guardian, June 29, 2015
- Situation Videos – video essays on contemporary issues
- Academy of American Poets site – Her site includes an excerpt from Don't Let Me Be Lonely
- "PennSound: Claudia Rankine". University of Pennsylvania PennSound.
- The Racial Imaginary Institute - official website
