= Just Us: An American Conversation =

Just Us: An American Conversation is a 2020 book and anthology of essays, poems, and personal anecdotes written by American author and poet Claudia Rankine. An "arrangement of essays, poems, and images [which] includes the voices and rebuttals of others", it describes and outlines an ideal response to forms of racism in contemporary settings. The book received mixed reviews from critics.

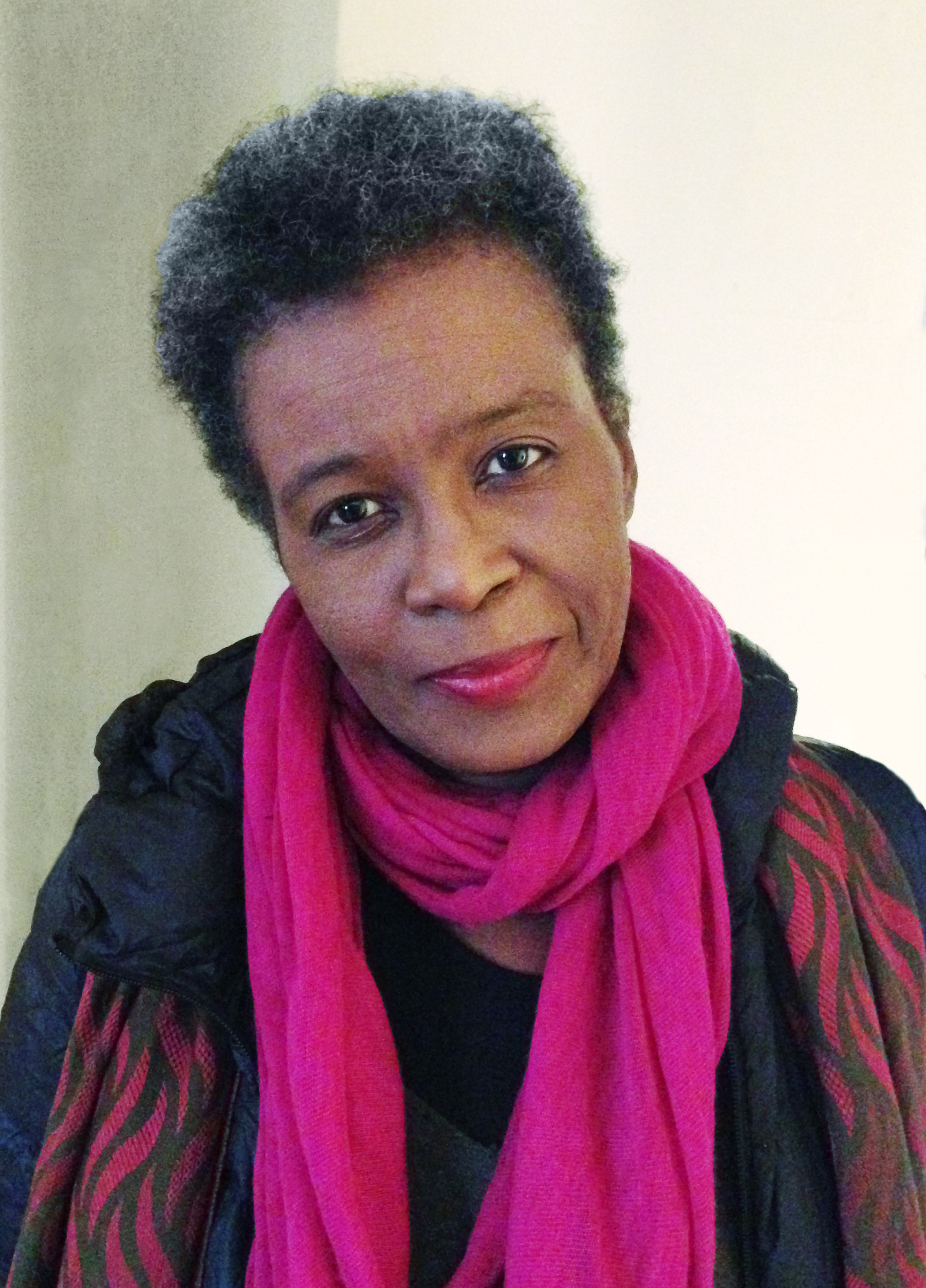
Author Claudia Rankine

== Summary ==
In Just Us: An American Conversation, Rankine describes encounters throughout the course of her life in which she had to deal with the ignorance of others—the majority of those typically being white men. In the face of ignorance she began to tap into subjects that she believes aren't discussed frequently enough. Rankine finds herself in numerous social situations where she feels she is being silenced. She expresses the desire to ask men she encounters about their white privilege and their opinions on the matter. She refers back to an issue that happened during a police training seminar—a female officer in the audience draws attention to the leading officer's statement concerning his dubious understanding of where the police brutality statistics comes from. When asked about the percentage of transgender victims of police brutality, the female officer calls out his skewed perception through a lens of white privilege. The conflict was initiated when the officer said he did not understand the percentage of victims to police brutality because he and his friends had never encountered such situations. After she made her comment on his privilege, he said that the comment was extremely offensive. Rankine discloses how this particular situation led to her hesitation in calling out patriarchal privileges and asking the questions she wanted to ask. Eventually, she did ask those difficult questions in many of her future encounters.

Rankine acknowledges that her past experiences with people prepared her for the difficult questions she would have to ask. With further contact, she gathers responses on how others view whiteness and privilege. She integrates media and photography to expand her point on the conversation. She states that the only change whiteness wants is one that reflects itself. The more encounters she has, the more Rankine feels that change will only ever begin to occur when people come to terms with their whiteness. During a dinner party, one of the guests mentioned that he was writing a book on the 2016 presidential election, but failed to mention the role of racism when anti-black and anti-Latin racism, which Rankine believed was a factor in placing the current president in power. When she expressed her stance on the matter, she was interrupted by the hostess and, although it was not verbally expressed, Rankine felt she was being silenced on the matter. She writes that the privileged majority don’t want change because change for them would mean having to think differently. Rankine describes another encounter with a man at Yale—he says that his son’s inability to get an early acceptance into Yale is a result of not being able to "play the race card".

With the images in her book, Rankine portrays how the media has played a significant role in the participation of racism. Rankine shares various images of a commercial that aired on television where a Black man gets stuffed into a washing machine and out comes an Asian man. Rankine felt as if they were making a clear statement on the preference of skin color in the world. She also introduced images of a video on YouTube with step-by-step on skin whitening where she expresses her issues with the normalization of skin whitening pointing out darker skin isn't quite accepted by society. Rankine takes the topic further by relating it to children and their early onset biases on race—referring back to the doll studies by Kenneth and Mamie Clark where children are asked to pick either the white, doll or the black doll. The children are asked questions such as "Which doll is the dumb one?" or "Which one is bad?" and children did show a preference for the white doll. She includes the input of Erin Winkler who argues that children do develop certain preferences because at a young they become aware of which social groups are favored as well as the societal norms.

== Background ==
Just Us was published in September 2020, four years after Rankine's previous award-winning book Citizen. In an interview with NPR, she says that she was motivated to write this book because she was interested in knowing how a "system that was shaped with the tenets of white supremacy" would affect how she socializes with others and how white people socialize with her. Rankine explains her method for trying to engage with people to talk about white male privilege started off as trying to be unassuming and hoping that the conversation would lead into the topic. Eventually, she would find an opening and move the conversation towards the topic of white privilege.

In the same interview, Rankine admits that the title of the book, Just Us, comes from comedian Richard Pryor in a joke about the criminal justice system in which he says, "You go down there looking for justice. That's what you find — just us."

== Themes ==
Racism is the biggest theme of Just Us, with the book centering around the personal experiences of Claudia Rankine. Since the 2016 election, many social issues came to the spotlight. Rankine writes about her experiences at dinner parties. In one instance, Rankine challenges a man on the 2016 election, with his theory being that Trump's win will quiet racism.

White privilege is another theme brought up in Just Us. Rankine initiates this conversation through her experiences with white people. She explains how the color white seems to be the pinnacle of everything. The New York Times explores this point with Rankine saying whiteness is dominant, so the question of "what is black" must always follow "what is white?"

Just Us focuses on themes of race, interracial communication, white privilege, and intersectionality. Centering on the barriers established around race and gender, Rankine focuses on the miscommunication between these different social groups while taking note on the nature of whiteness and the difficulty in defining it. The book also notes the structure of race in a modern context with regards to femininity and beauty standards and examines the effect of their discourse. Rankine simultaneously acknowledges themes of racial color-blindness, and what she perceives to be the failings of such mindsets.

== Reception ==
Claudia Rankine's Just Us: An American Conversation was the first book to be nominated by the National Book Critics Circle for both poetry and criticism.

An article from The New Yorker by Katy Waldman described the book: "The book returns often to the phrase 'what if', but it feels besieged by 'what is': unfreedom is the point, as is a shift in the 'American conversation' from hope to a kind of dignified resignation". She also says that the book surpasses language, and instead asks for healing. It ties together poetry and criticism.

Writer from The Atlantic Ismail Muhammad said, "Rankine's intent is not simply to expose or chastise whiteness. She has something more nuanced in mind: using conversation as a way to invite white people to consider how contingent their lives are upon the racial order—every bit as contingent as Black people’s are". Both critics have commented on Rankine's use of criticism and lyricism.

Maya Phillips of The New York Times notes how Rankine infuses her knowledge and insight of the dominance of whiteness to create an interrogation at a theoretical distance yet criticizes the work as, at times, filled with suffocation and incoherence. "But even in Rankine's inarguable genius, Just Us feels as if it skips a small step in the progression of the book, the movement from start to finish among the separate chapters."

Katherine Preston of MAKE Literary Magazine declares it as a meditative sociological work seen through Rankine’s personal anecdotes, alongside extensive citations, images, and quotes. These writing methods further call for self-reflection and responsibility for its white readers as Rankine continually breaks the barrier behind discussing such topics.

The Christian Science Monitor named Just Us a best nonfiction book of 2020, remarking, "This consciousness-raising, bravura combination of personal essays, poems, photographs, and cultural commentary works on so many levels and is a skyscraper in the literature on racism."

The New York Times named Just Us one of the 10 Best Books of 2020 and the 100 Notable Books of 2020. Time Magazine had it in The 100 must-read books of 2020, claiming it is "...one of the most viral texts on race to arrive this year". Publishers Weekly placed Just Us as one of the Best Nonfiction books of 2020.
