= Guillermo Gómez-Peña =

Chicano artist

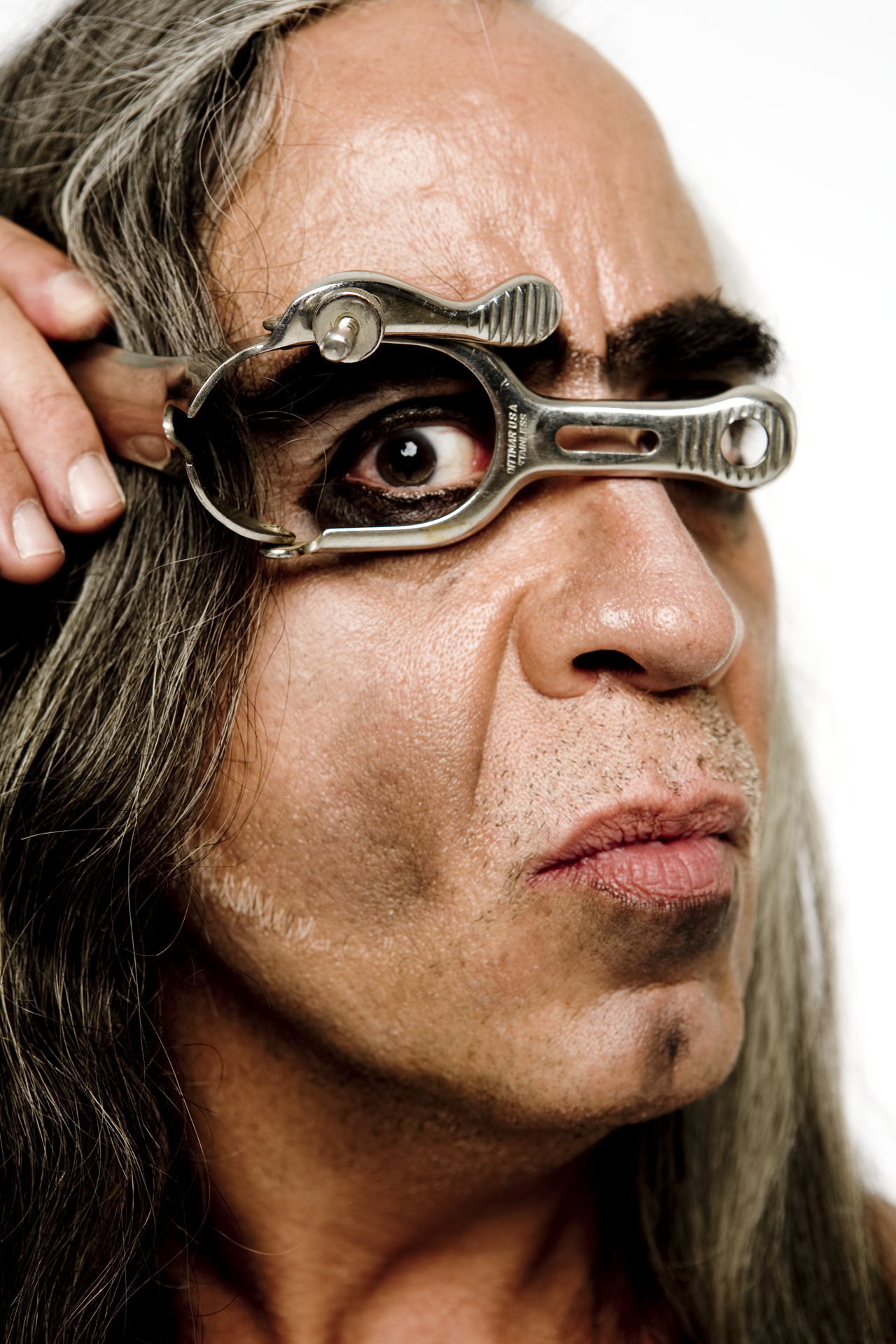
- Born: September 23, 1955 (age 71); Mexico City
- Education: National Autonomous University of Mexico; California Institute of the Arts
- Notable work: Border Brujo; Couple in The Cage: Two Undiscovered Amerindians Visit the West
- Spouse: Balitronica Gómez
- Awards: John D. and Catherine T. MacArthur Fellowship; 1991 Writer and Interdisciplinary Artist – MacArthur Fellows Program
- Website: guillermogomezpena.com

Guillermo Gómez-Peña is a Mexican/Chicano performance artist, writer, activist, and educator. Gómez-Peña has created work in multiple media, including performance art, experimental radio, video, photography and installation art. His fifteen books include essays, experimental poetry, performance scripts, photographs and chronicles in both English, Spanish and Spanglish. He is a founding member of the pioneering art collective Border Arts Workshop/Taller de Arte Fronterizo (1985-1992) and artistic director of the performance art troupe La Pocha Nostra.

Gómez-Peña has contributed to cultural debates for over 30 years staging seminal performance art pieces including Border Brujo (1988-1989), Couple in The Cage: Two Undiscovered Amerindians Visit the West (with Coco Fusco, 1992–93), The Cruci-fiction Project (with Roberto Sifuentes, 1994), Temple of Confessions (1995), The Mexterminator Project (1997–99), The Living Museum of Fetishized Identities (1999-2002), The Mapa/Corpo series (2004-2013) and most recently the border opera We Are All Aliens (2018–present). His award-winning solo performances mix experimental aesthetics, activist politics, Spanglish humor and audience participation to create a "total experience" for the audience member/reader/viewer.

Gomez-Pena received a MacArthur Foundation fellowship in 1991 for his work as a writer and interdisciplinary artist.

== Biography ==
=== Early life ===
Guillermo Gómez-Peña was born in Mexico City in 1955. He studied Linguistics and Latin American Literature at National Autonomous University of Mexico (UNAM) from 1974–1978. He moved to the US in 1978 and studied at California Institute of the Arts, earning a B.F.A. in 1981 and an M.F.A. in 1983.

=== Work ===
From 1983 until 1990, Gómez-Peña lived in the San Diego/Tijuana border region. Most of his artistic and intellectual work concerns the interface between North and South (Mexico and the U.S.), border culture and the politics of the brown body. His original interdisciplinary arts projects and books explore borders, physical, cultural and symbolic, between his two countries and between the mainstream U.S. art world and the various Latino cultures, including the U.S.-Mexico border itself, immigration, cross-cultural and hybrid identities, and the confrontation and misunderstandings between cultures, languages and races.

His artwork and literature also explore the politics of language, the side effects of globalization, "extreme culture," the culture of violence and new technologies from a Latino perspective. He is a patron of the London-based Live Art Development Agency and a Senior Fellow of the Hemispheric Institute of Performance and Politics (NYU).

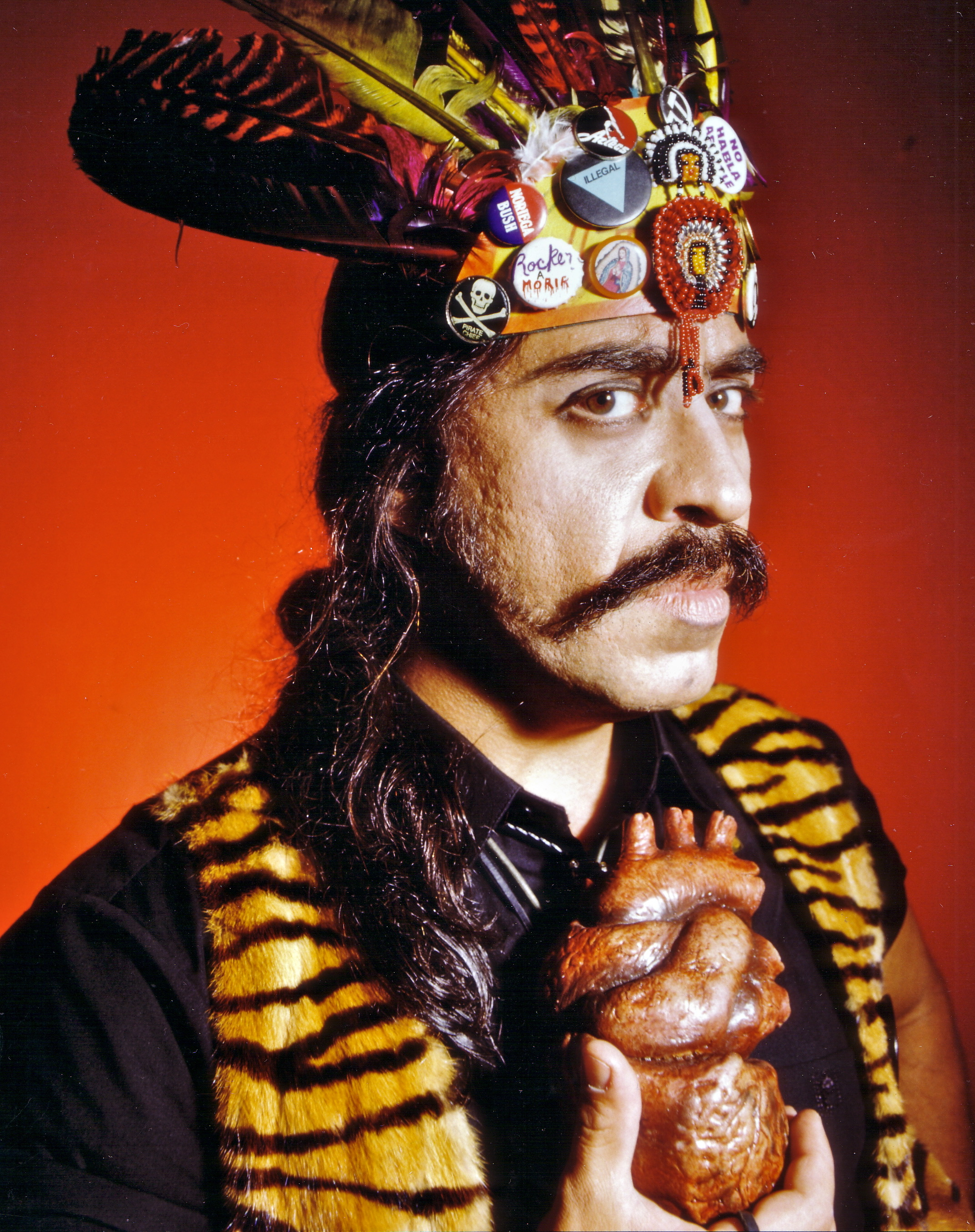
Naftazteca is Guillermo Gomez Pena

==== La Pocha Nostra ====
Gómez-Peña is the artistic director of the international performance troupe La Pocha Nostra. La Pocha Nostra is a trans-disciplinary arts organization that provides a support network and forum for artists of various disciplines, generations and ethnic backgrounds. La Pocha is devoted to erasing the borders between art and politics, art practice and theory, artist and spectator. La Pocha Nostra has intensely focused on the notion of collaboration across national borders, race, gender and generations as an act of radical citizen diplomacy and as a means to create temporary communities of rebel artists. Every year, La Pocha conducts a summer and a winter performance art school in which the troupe's radical pedagogy (body-based methodology that has been developed during the last 20 years) is shared with international groups of rebel artists.

Gómez-Peña's work with La Pocha Nostra has been presented across the US, Canada, Mexico, Latin America, Europe, Russia, Australia and South Africa. In recent years, the troupe has presented work at Tate Modern (London), Arnolfini (Bristol), the Guggenheim Museum (New York), LACMA (Los Angeles), the House of World Cultures and the Volksbuhne (Berlin), MACBA (Barcelona), El Museo de la Ciudad (Mexico City) and the Encuentros Hemisféricos in Lima, Rio de Janeiro, Belo Horizonte, Buenos Aires and São Paulo. Gomez-Peña and La Pocha Nostra have participated in the following biennales: Havana, The Whitney, Sydney, Liverpool, Thessaloniki and Mercosur. The troupe's photo performances are now in the permanent collection of Daros Foundation (Zurich) and Galeria Artificios (Gran Canaria).

In 2018 the troupe performed The Most (un)Documented Mexican Artist at Los Angeles Contemporary Exhibitions. In 2019 the troupe performed Enchilada Western: A Living Museum of Fetishized Identities at The PASEO art festival in Taos, New Mexico.

==== Collaboration with Coco Fusco ====
Gómez-Peña traveled internationally for two years with fellow artist Coco Fusco performing The Year of the White Bear and Two Undiscovered Amerindians Visit the West (1992–1994), a satirical performance piece in which the two artists were exhibited in a cage in museums and at arts festivals as "authentic" Amerindians from a previously undiscovered island off the Mexican coast. The pair dressed up in a hodgepodge of ethnic drag and bits of Americana such as a baseball cap and grass skirt in the case of Fusco, face paint and a leopard-skin wrestling mask for Gómez-Peña. Coco Fusco described the piece as "a satirical commentary both on the Quincentenary celebrations and on the history of this practice of exhibiting human beings from Africa, Asia, and Latin America in Europe and the United States in zoos, theaters, and museums." During its run, the critically acclaimed piece was performed at major museums and arts festivals in New York, Washington, DC, Los Angeles, Chicago and Madrid, Spain, amongst others.

The Year of the White Bear was sometimes accompanied by a performance piece entitled New World (B)Order, which Chicago Reader art critic Carmela Rago called "the denouement of the performance installation at the Field Museum; using irony and humor Gomez-Pena and Fusco allowed us to contemplate the next step--being part of a world border culture, reclaiming our humanity and our hearts." The artists also worked with filmmaker Paula Heredia to create The Couple in the Cage: Guatianaui Odyssey, a documentary that records several performances for The Year of the White Bear as well as viewer reactions to the work.

==== Collaborations with additional artists ====
Besides ongoing projects with La Pocha Nostra (Emma Tramposch, Saul Garcia Lopez, Micha Espinoza, Paloma Martinez-Cruz, Balitronica, and Roberto Gomez-Hernandez), Gómez-Peña has made collaboration an integral part of his artistic practice. He thinks of collaboration as a form of “radical citizenship”. Some of his notable collaborative projects include artworks created with: James Luna, Reverend Billy, Tania Bruguera, Annie Sprinkle, Richard Montoya (Culture Clash), René Yañez, Sara Shelton-Mann, VestAndPage, galindog, Post-Commodity and Non-Grata.

== Awards and honors ==
- The Guggenheim Fellowship, 2019
- The Fleishhacker Foundation Eureka Fellowship, 2016
- United States Artists Fellow award, 2012
- The Free Culture Award, 2012
- Cineaste Lifetime Achievement Award, 2000
- The American Book Award for New World Border, 1997
- Viva Los Artistas Award, 1993
- John D. and Catherine T. MacArthur Fellowship, 1991. Gómez-Peña was the first Chicano artist to receive this award.
- Prix de la Parole, 1989
- The Bessie Award, 1989

== Bibliography ==
=== Books ===
- Warrior for Gringostroika (book, Graywolf Press, 1993, ISBN 1-55597-199-7)
- The New World Border: Prophecies, Poems & Loqueras for the End of the world (book, City Lights, 1996) ISBN 978-0-87286-313-2
- Temple of Confessions: Mexican Beasts and Living Santos (book, powerHouse Books, 1997, ISBN 978-1576870044)
- Dangerous Border Crossers (book, Routledge, 2000)
- Codex Espangliensis (book, City Lights, 2000) ISBN 978-0-87286-367-5
- "Ethno-Techno: Writings on Performance, Activism and Pedagogy (book, Routledge, 2005, ISBN 978-0415362481)
- El Mexterminator (book, Oceano, 2005) Spanish.
- Bitacora del Cruce (book, Fondo de Cultura Economica, 2006) Spanish and Spanglish.
- Conversations Across Borders (book, Seagull Books, 2011) Laura Levin ed.
- Exercises for Rebel Artists (book, Routledge, 2011)
- Doc/Undoc (book, City Lights, 2017, ISBN 9780872867208; with Felicia Rice)
- Gómez-Peña Unplugged: Texts on Live Art, Social Practice and Imaginary Activism (forthcoming Routledge 2020)
- La Pocha Nostra: A handbook for the rebel artist in a post-democratic society (forthcoming Routledge 2020)

=== Video ===
Year	Video name	Notes
2008	Border Clasicos	An anthology of his video works, 1988-2008, Video Data Bank
2008	Homo Fronterizus	A collection of his collaborations with Mexican filmmaker Gustavo Vazquez, 2008, Onbound store, Live Art Development Agency, London
2005	Ethno-techno: Los video grafitis	A collaboration with Daniel Salazar, Gustavo Vazquez, Jethro Rothe-Kushel, and many other independent filmmakers, 1990–2005

== See also ==
- Performance art
- Spanglish
- Conceptual art
- Latino literature
