= Couple in The Cage: Two Undiscovered Amerindians Visit the West =

Performance art piece by Coco Fusco and Guillermo Gómez-Peña

The Couple in a Cage: Two Amerindians Visit the West was a 1992–93 performance art piece by artists Coco Fusco and Guillermo Gómez-Peña for their exhibition The Year of the White Bear and Two Undiscovered Amerindians Visit the West which toured five countries and was performed in nine different locations. First performed in honor of the quincentenary anniversary of Christopher Columbus' arrival to the Americas, the work sought to make visible the history of abuse, captivity and exploitation of indigenous peoples. Their inspiration drew heavily upon the history of othering, the human zoo, and life stories of historical figures such as Ota Benga and Sarah Baartman—beginning with the kidnapping of Arawak Indians by Columbus and his men to be displayed in the Spanish Court.

== Staging and performance ==
Presenting themselves as previously undiscovered Amerindians from the fictional uncolonized island of Guatinau, Fusco and Gómez-Peña presented a fabricated Encyclopædia Britannica entry on "Amerindians" and a corresponding map of the Gulf of Mexico island of Guatinau as part of the staging of their performance. This information was further supplemented both by plaques or pedestals alluding to the history of peoples placed on exhibit over the last 500 years. Other texts provided also narrated their role as volunteer representatives of Guatinau, detailing the daily life activities of the Amerindians, and validating the habitat of the cage and its contents as their natural habitat.

Aided by the students of the University of California-Irvine, the artists erected a cage and filled it with a radio & cassette player, candles, Polaroid camera and film, bed pans, ritual artifacts, spray paint, body paint, a television and hammock. Students and institutional staff members served as guards and assistants to the caged couple: feeding them, educating the audience about their origins, and assisting audience members in taking commemorative Polaroids with the caged performers. Those acting as docents or guards also were responsible for the daily disposal of cage waste, feeding the performers, and escorting them to the bathroom on a leash.

Gómez-Peña and Fusco were outfitted in primitive costumes: designer sunglasses, a cheetah luchador mask, leather boots, face paint, long wigs, grass skirt, necklaces, a leopard bikini top and Converse low sneakers.

The caged artists performed "traditional" Guatinau tasks: watching television, sewing voodoo dolls, using a laptop computer, pacing back and forth, eating or being fed fruit, and drinking bottled water and Coca-Cola Classic.

In contrast to works from their own practices and from other collaborations, the artists remained silent during the performances, apart from Gómez-Peña, who would recite traditional stories in a fictitious nonsensical language in return for donations. By the last performance, these "traditional stories" chronicled the Guatinaui tour of the West, with the nonsensical outpouring peppered with recognizable words like "Chicago", "Mexico", "Minnesota" and "America".

== Contexts ==
=== University of California-Irvine ===
As "Take One" of The Year of the White Bear, held at the Fine Arts Gallery of UC-Irvine from February 24 - March 4, 1992, with performances held all day March 1, 2, 3 with "ritual events" at 7:30 on the 3rd and 4th Before the performance the artists were contacted by the Health Department of UC-Irvine due to the misunderstanding that they were anthropologists bringing in "real aborigines" whose excrement could be hazardous. One woman went so far as to ask for a rubber glove in order to fondle Gómez-Peña in a sexual manner. Approximately 1,000 individuals saw these performances.

=== Columbus Plaza, Madrid ===
Selected for the Edge Biennial, the artists took their performance to a much more public context in Columbus Plaza of May 1992. Edge '92, taking place in both London and Madrid, was planned as a quincentennial celebration of Madrid as a hub of European culture. Spanish businessmen reverted to childhood, mocking the performers with ape noises, while school children compared the performers to the wax Arawak figures housed in the museum across the street. Teenagers also attempted to burn Gómez-Peña while handing him a beer bottle filled with urine. Men donated to see Fusco dance, explaining that they wanted to see her breasts. More than half of the people believed the performance to be a real display of Amerindians.

=== Covent Garden, London ===
Three days after Madrid, the pair performed in Covent Gardens. Covent Gardens as a venue has a history as a location where people of color have been exhibited, starting from the 17th century through to the 18th century. It was even the venue for the play Omai, inspired by the Omai, a Tahitian native who embodied the idea of the noble savage. During the performance a group of neo-nazis attempted to rattle the cage.

=== Walker Art Center, Minneapolis ===
Exhibited as part of their show The Year of the White Bear, the performance took place outside in the Sculpture Garden of the Walker Art Center in September 1992. 15,000 visitors saw the performance and exhibition. This is the first of two instances in which the work was clearly presented in an art context.

=== Smithsonian's National Museum of Natural History, Washington D.C. ===
On view from October 17-18th, 1992, the performance reached approximately 120,000 visitors over a two-day period. The performance confused many museum goers who questioned the authenticity, and who were even more perplexed when docents continued to keep up the performance. One alarmed attendee even called the Humane Society to seek assistance in freeing the caged couple.

=== Australian Museum of Natural History, Sydney ===
In December 1992 the artists performed at the Australian Museum of Natural History, with approximately 5,000 visitors; staff members here became uneasy after Japanese tourists left the museum deeply disturbed, fearing this would result in negative press for the museum. One woman sat down with her young child to loudly apologize to the performers for having "taken [their] land away".

=== Field Museum of Natural History, Chicago ===
From January 16–17, 1993 Gómez-Peña and Fusco performed at the Field Museum of Natural History in Chicago, aided by Field Museum "docents" played by Paula Killen, Claire DeCoster and Pablo Helguera. Following a script written by the artists, DeCoster and Helguera encouraged the audience's questions and analysis while members of the museum's education department surveyed visitors. This was a devastating experience for the docents, as they witnessed the large majority of the audience persistently ignore the plaques on either side of the cage and believe the Amerindians to be real. Approximately 5,000 people attended, with the Field Museum receiving 48 phone calls regarding the misinformation the public believed was due to the Field Museum.

=== Whitney Biennial, New York ===
The Couple in the Cage: Two Undiscovered Amerindians Visit the West ended its tour as a selection of the 1993 Whitney Biennial, an exhibition noted to be one of the most consciousness-raising in the history of the Biennial. In addition to the traditional Guatinaui tasks Gómez-Peña and Fusco consistently performed, the artists offered views of Gómez-Peña's genitals for donations of five dollars a view, and a native dance to hip hop music for fifty cents. This was one of the two instances in which the work was clearly presented and contextualized as artwork during the entirety of its tour. Despite this, some attendees assumed the artists were actors performing in a work by an artist.

== Reception ==
Criticism for The Couple in the Cage varied upon the location of the presentation, though what alarmed the artists most was the substantial public belief that their performances were reality and the substantial number of critics who critiqued their work as unethical due to its misrepresentation, rather than to fully discuss its cultural and institutional critique.

Despite a substantial number of intellectuals remaining critical towards the misinformation of the performances, performative scholar Barbara Kirshenblatt-Gimblett points out that Gómez-Peña's and Fusco's were not the first to fictionalize ethnography, but rather participate inside a previously established history.

The performance gained further recognition and criticism through its participation in the 1993 Whitney Biennial; despite reflecting the political times, art critic Roberta Smith disparaged that the exhibition lost sight of art as a visual experience in its motivations to further a cause.

People of color responded either in distaste due to the inauthentic nature of the performance, discomfort in identifying with the experience, or solidarity in its symbolism:

"One Pueblo elder from Arizona who saw us in the Smithsonian went so far as to say that our display was more "real" than any other statement about the condition of Native peoples in the Museum."

-Coco Fusco, The Other History of Intercultural Performance

== See also ==
- Take a Picture With a Real Indian (1991–93) and The Artifact Piece (1987/1990), similar performances by Payómkawichum-Ipi and Chicano artist James Luna
