= Jayson Musson =

African American artist

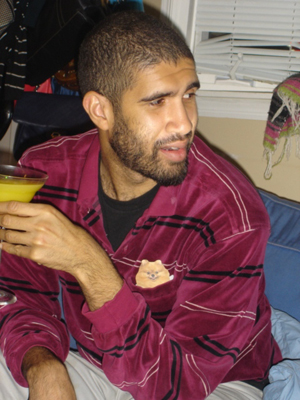
- Born: 1977; The Bronx
- Education: University of Pennsylvania, University of the Arts, Skowhegan School of Painting and Sculpture
- Website: jaysonmusson.com

Jayson Scott Musson is an African-American musician and artist who lives and works in Brooklyn, New York. He was a member of the hip-hop group Plastic Little.

== Early life ==
Musson was born in The Bronx, New York. In an interview in Nat. Brut magazine, Musson said that he grew up in Spring Valley, about 25 minutes from New York City.

He stated that he was "pretty much a very quiet kid" who "didn’t care too much for athletics or whatever, just drawing."

Musson earned a BFA degree in photography from the University of the Arts in Philadelphia, Pennsylvania. In 2011, he completed an MFA in painting from the University of Pennsylvania.

He currently lives and works in Brooklyn, New York.

== Career ==
=== Music ===
Musson is an original member of the Philadelphian rap group Plastic Little, formed during the summer of 2001. A track from the group, "Miller Time", was sampled by Baauer in his 2012 song "Harlem Shake". The Baauer track went double platinum in the United States and inspired a viral internet trend. Along with Plastic Little, Musson performed with British producer Mark Ronson, as well as collaborated with a number of notable Philadelphian acts including Spank Rock and Amanda Blank.

=== Video ===
In 2010, Musson created the character of Hennessy Youngman, which subsequently became an Internet phenomenon through the popularity of the "Art Thoughtz" video series. Musson publicly divides his persona with the character's by referring to Youngman as his "cousin". Musson's "ART THOUGHTZ" series is distributed internationally by Electronic Arts Intermix.

== Solo exhibitions ==
- 2002: Too Black for BET, Space 1026, Philadelphia, PA
- 2006: Too Black for BET, Episode II: The Black Boy George, Space 1026, Philadelphia, PA
- 2008: Too Black For BET, Dazed & Confused Magazine Gallery, London, England
- 2011: Hennessy Youngman & Nathaniel Snerpus Present: The Grand Manner, Pennsylvania Academy of the Fine Arts, Philadelphia, PA
- 2011: Neoteny: The Hard Sell, Marginal Utility Gallery, Philadelphia, PA
- 2012: A True Fiend's Weight, Fleisher/Ollman Gallery, Philadelphia, PA
- 2012: Halcyon Days, Salon 94, New York, NY
- 2016: The Truth in the Song, Fleisher/Ollman Gallery, Philadelphia, PA
- 2022: His History of Art, The Fabric Workshop and Museum, Philadelphia, PA
