= Murder of James Craig Anderson =

2011 hate crime murder in Mississippi, U.S.

- James Craig Anderson
- Location: Jackson, Mississippi, U.S.
- Date: June 26, 2011; 15 years ago
- Attack type: Murder by vehicle, hate crime, beating, robbery
- Victims: James Craig Anderson, aged 47
- Perpetrators: Deryl Paul Dedmon; John Aaron Rice; Dylan Wade Butler; John Louis Blalack; Sarah Adelia Graves; Robert Henry Rice; Shelbie Brooke Richards
- Motive: Anti-black racism, white supremacy
- Verdict: All pleaded guilty
- Convictions: State: Dedmon: Capital murder, hate crime Federal: Dedmon, Rice, Butler: Hate crime act resulting in death All perpetrators: Conspiracy to commit hate crimes Richards: Misprision of a felony
- Sentence: Dedmon: Life imprisonment without the possibility of parole (Note: Concurrent 50-year federal prison sentence.); Blalack: 20 years in prison Rice: 18 1/2 years in prison Richards: 8 years in prison Butler: 7 years in prison Graves: 5 years in prison

James Craig Anderson was a 47-year-old American man who was murdered in a hate crime in Jackson, Mississippi, on June 26, 2011, by 18-year-old Deryl Dedmon of Brandon. At the time of his death, Anderson was working on the assembly line at the Nissan plant in Canton, and raising an adopted son with his partner.

According to police, Dedmon and his friends, a group of white teenagers, robbed and repeatedly beat Anderson before Dedmon ran him over, causing fatal injuries. A motel security camera showed Dedmon and his associates, as well as Dedmon running Anderson over with his truck.

The FBI conducted a high-profile civil rights investigation of Anderson's murder; it led to indictments of ten people, including Dedmon, for a conspiracy of several hate crimes against African Americans in Jackson committed from the spring of 2011 to March 2012. Anderson's murder was classified as a racially motivated hate crime. Eventually, all ten were indicted for various combinations of these crimes. They each pleaded guilty and received federal sentences.

Anderson's family asked that the perpetrators of the murder be spared the death penalty. Dedmon was convicted of murder in state court in 2012 and sentenced to two concurrent terms of life imprisonment.

In March 2012, Dedmon, John Rice and Dylan Butler pleaded guilty to federal hate crime and conspiracy charges. In December 2012, William Kirk Montgomery and Jonathan Kyle Gaskamp (Born Jonathan Kyle Holton) also pleaded guilty to conspiracy and federal hate crimes for their roles, as well. They were among the 10 indicted for multiple attacks against African Americans in Jackson. On February 10, 2015, U.S. District Judge Carlton Reeves sentenced Dedmon to 50 years in prison, Rice to 18 1/2 years, and Butler to 7 years for their roles in the hate crime. Their federal sentences run concurrently to additional state ones, with the defendants not eligible for parole.

== Victim background ==
James Craig Anderson was born on June 30, 1963, in Holmes County, Mississippi. His mother is Annzora Anderson. His father died when Anderson was young. Anderson had a sister, Barbara Anderson Young, and two brothers, Louis and Edward J. Anderson. They attended local schools.

Anderson later moved to Jackson, Mississippi, where he participated in church and was known for his tenor. For seventeen years he had been in a relationship with James Bradfield and was helping him rear a young relative for whom the latter was guardian. In the seven years prior to his death, Anderson had been working on the assembly line at the Nissan plant in the Jackson suburb of Canton, Mississippi.

== Events ==
A group of young white men and women were drinking and partying in the small town of Puckett in Rankin County, Mississippi. According to a lawyer representing one (or more) of the perpetrators, they decided to go buy more beer in a location where stores were open later at night. According to law enforcement officials, Deryl Dedmon, an 18-year-old white man from the Jackson suburb of Brandon, Mississippi, led the group in planning to attack blacks in Jackson. They talked about collecting bottles to throw at people. Dedmon said to friends, "Let's go fuck with some niggers." The group split up between Dedmon's green 1998 Ford F-250 truck and a white Jeep Cherokee. They each drove 16 miles (26 km) west on Interstate 20 to a predominantly black area on the western edge of Jackson.

According to prosecutors, the people in the Jeep were the first to spot James Craig Anderson near his truck in the parking lot at the Metro Inn in Jackson at 5 am on June 26. They contacted Dedmon and the others to join them.

The two vehicles with the group of whites pulled off the freeway and into the motel parking lot. The group said they believed that Anderson was trying to steal a vehicle because they saw him trying to break into one. The vehicle was Anderson's own; he had lost his keys. The group repeatedly beat Anderson and robbed him, the district attorney said, citing reports from witnesses. Video from a motel security camera shows the perpetrators entering and leaving the picture frame, but did not capture the beating. One witness reported that one of the perpetrators yelled, "white power", when returning to his truck after the beating.

William Montgomery drove the Jeep away with several passengers, including John Aaron Rice. Dedmon drove his pickup truck over Anderson, who was staggering along the edge of the lot. This attack was captured on video. Dedmon caused fatal injuries, and Anderson died a few days later. Dedmon left the scene at a high speed.

Later Dedmon boasted about beating and running Anderson over, saying, "I ran that nigger over," to his accomplices in the Jeep. Law enforcement officials said that Dedmon repeated that statement with the racial slur in subsequent conversations.

== Investigations ==
Dedmon was arrested by the Hinds County Sheriff on July 6 and was charged with capital murder. The incident was considered to be a racially motivated hate crime; Hinds County District Attorney Robert Shuler Smith said that the killers spoke racial slurs during the attack. "This was a crime of hate," he told CNN. "Dedmon murdered this man because he was black." John Aaron Rice, then a teenager, assaulted Anderson before he was run over and was charged with simple assault. Rice was released on $5,000 bail. Prosecutors pursued additional charges against Rice, as well as Dedmon's other accomplices who were at the scene.

The FBI opened an investigation into the crime as a civil rights violation. FBI spokeswoman Deborah Madden said on August 17 that the bureau wanted to "determine whether federal civil rights crimes occurred", including hate crimes. Their investigation revealed a larger pattern of attacks against African Americans. From 2012 to 2014, the FBI indicted a total of 10 individuals involved in a conspiracy to commit hate crimes against African Americans in Jackson, including the attack against Anderson. Four other incidents, beginning in the spring of 2011 and extending through March 22, 2012, included the following:

- Punching and kicking an African-American man walking near a golf course in the body, head, and face until he begged for his life.
- Attempting to run over an African-American man in a parking lot, quickly accelerating their vehicle in an attempt to hit him (the man was able to jump out of the way).
- Throwing glass bottles at African-American targeted victims.
- Using a sling shot to attack various African-American individuals, including a teenage boy riding a bike.

== Convictions and sentences ==
On September 20, a grand jury indicted Dedmon on charges of capital murder as well as a hate crime. Capital murder in Mississippi carries the sentences of death or life in prison without parole, and the state's hate crime law provides for more severe sentences. Attorneys for both Dedmon and Rice initially denied that the crime was racially motivated. Rice's attorney said the teens were on a "beer run" and that they were not looking for a black man to assault.

Dedmon entered a plea of not guilty at a preliminary hearing held on September 30. On March 21, 2012, he entered a guilty plea to murder and a federal hate crime charge. He was sentenced to two concurrent life sentences in prison. During his sentencing, Dedmon apologized to Anderson's family.

On March 22, 2012, Dedmon, Rice, and Butler pleaded guilty to federal hate crime and conspiracy charges. On December 4, 2012, Jonathan Gaskamp, Joseph Dominick, and William Montgomery also pleaded guilty to federal hate crime and conspiracy charges. These three had not been with Dedmon and his friends the night of the attack on Anderson.

Another four of the total of 10 charged with hate crimes were indicted on eight counts in July 2014: John Louis Blalack, Sarah Adelia Graves, Robert Henry Rice, and Shelbie Brooke Richards, all of whom had been with Dedmon and his group the night of the attack against Anderson. All 10 of the conspirators pleaded guilty. Except for Dedmon, they were sentenced to 4–18 years in federal prison.

On February 10, 2015, United States District Judge for the Southern District of Mississippi Carlton Reeves sentenced Dedmon to 50 years in prison, Rice to 18 1/2 years, and Butler to 7 years for their roles in the hate crimes. Their federal sentences run concurrently to the state ones, and they are not eligible for parole.

== Aftermath ==
Initially the case was being investigated locally. Release of the motel video showing Anderson being run over attracted national attention, ultimately resulting in a federal civil rights investigation. On August 14, 2011, about 500 people marched in Jackson from a church to the motel to denounce the "racially motivated hate crime". The group included a mix of "rich/poor, black/white, male/female, gay and straight," according to 75-year-old activist Rims Barber, among them Christian and Jewish clergy. On the Internet a "war of words" ensued as to how the crime should be classified. The subsequent FBI investigation found evidence of a conspiracy by 10 individuals to commit several hate crimes against African Americans in Jackson from the spring of 2011 to 2012. These 10 were indicted, each pleaded guilty, and each was sentenced to federal prison.

With the help of the Southern Poverty Law Center, in September 2011 the siblings and mother of James Anderson filed a wrongful-death lawsuit against seven of the group who were involved in the attack on him. Anderson had a 17-year relationship with James Bradfield and was helping him raise a young relative for whom he was guardian. As Mississippi law did not recognize such relationships, Bradfield could not participate in the civil suit.

On behalf of Anderson's family, his sister wrote a letter to Hinds County District Attorney Robert Shuler Smith, requesting that those responsible for Anderson's death be spared from the death penalty, citing the family's Christian values. The letter stated,

They also have caused our family unspeakable pain and grief. But our loss will not be lessened by the state taking the life of another. ... We also oppose the death penalty because it historically has been used in Mississippi and the South primarily against people of color for killing whites. Executing James' killers will not help balance the scales. But sparing them may help to spark a dialogue that one day will lead to the elimination of capital punishment.

The case has been called a lynching by many sources, including the New York Times.

In 2023, Deryl Dedmon's cousin Christian Dedmon was one of six law enforcement officers who tortured two Black men in Rankin County, south of Jackson.

== Legacy ==
The family established the James Craig Anderson Foundation for Racial Tolerance.
