= Paula Heredia =

Paula Patricia Heredia Suarez (born October 13, 1957 in San Salvador, El Salvador) is a filmmaker based in New York City. She is the daughter of radio and television pioneer Leonardo Heredia and writer and journalist, Mercedes Suarez.

== Career ==
Since 1987, Heredia has worked in New York as a director and film editor of documentaries. In 1996 she was awarded with an ACE-EDDIE (American Cinema Editors Award) for her work on the documentary film Unzipped a documentary portraying fashion designer Isaac Mizrahi. In 2001 she joined the producing team of HBO’s film In Memoriam, NYC 9/11/01 for which she was awarded a Primetime Emmy for Outstanding Picture Editing For Non-Fiction Programming.

In 2005, with partner and husband Larry Garvin, she founded Heredia Pictures, LLC, which produced Africa Rising, a film about the work of five activists leading a grassroots movement of end female genital mutilation in Africa. Heredia Pictures is currently producing Slavery and the Law.

Heredia keeps close ties with her country of origin, El Salvador and in 1996 she founded a non-profit organization, Clementina, Inc. with programs promoting education, culture and international exchange based in the small town of Suchitoto. Her flagship program is Cinema Digital, a program that teaches local youth the aesthetics and technology of how to make films with digital technology.

Under her direction, in 2006 Cinema Digital produced the short film La Pajara Pinta. This film was the result of a four years engagement with the children, parents and teachers of El Limon, a small mountain community in El Salvador. Currently, with the trainees of Cinema Digital, Heredia is in production of Alborada, which is slated to be released in 2011.

Heredia heads the international committee of New York Women in Film and Television, serves on the board of advisors of Robert De Niro Tribeca Film Institute’s All Access, serves on the board of directors of Clementina, Inc.

In 2005, she was chosen for the book: The Art of the Documentary by Megan Cunningham, which features Heredia’s work and her creative process.

== Personal life ==
Heredia grew up in El Salvador, Honduras and Costa Rica. She studied fine arts at the University of Costa Rica and filmmaking at NYU and has an Arts and Film degree from the State University of New York Empire State College. In 1985 she married Larry Garvin, a writer and business manager who was born in Argentina and raised in Venezuela, Chile and New York. Garvin and Heredia divide their work between Suchitoto, El Salvador and New York City.
