= Coco Fusco =

Cuban-American artist, writer, and curator (born 1960)

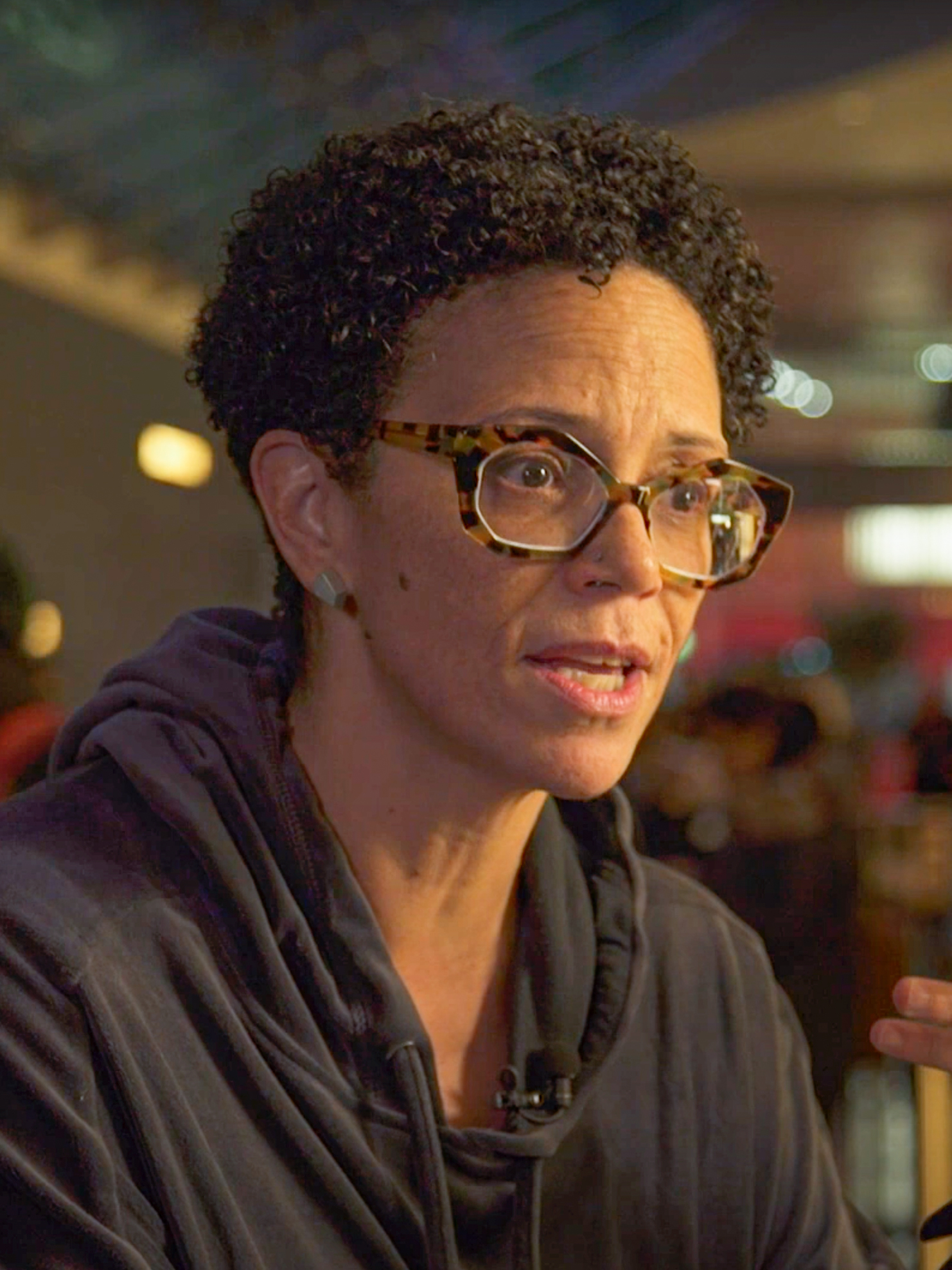
- Born: Juliana Emilia Fusco Miyares; June 18, 1960 (age 66); New York City, New York, U.S.
- Education: Brown University (1982), Stanford University (1985), Middlesex University (2007)
- Known for: Interdisciplinary art, writing
- Awards: 2013 Guggenheim Fellowship, 2013 Absolut Art Writing Award, 2003 Herb Alpert Award
- Website: http://cocofusco.com

Coco Fusco (born Juliana Emilia Fusco Miyares; June 18, 1960) is a Cuban-American interdisciplinary artist, writer, and curator whose work has been widely exhibited and published internationally. Fusco's work explores gender, identity, race, and power through performance, video, interactive installations, and critical writing.

== Early life and education ==
Fusco was born in 1960 in New York City. Her mother was a Cuban exile who had fled the Cuban revolution that year.

Fusco received a B.A in Semiotics from Brown University in 1982, an M.A. in Modern Thought and Literature from Stanford University in 1985 and a Ph.D. in Art and Visual Culture from Middlesex University in 2007.

== Career ==
After finishing graduate school in 1985, Fusco met a group of Cuban artists, including José Bedia, who were visiting the US. She began traveling to Cuba and participating in the visual arts scene there, until in the mid-1990s she withdrew as a result of post-Cold War political and cultural changes in the country.

Fusco has presented performances and videos in arts festivals worldwide, including the 56th Venice Biennale, three Whitney Biennials (2021, 2008, 1993), the Next Wave Festival at BAM, and Performa05. She is the recipient of the 2016 Greenfield Prize in Visual Art, a 2014 Cintas Fellowship, a 2013 Guggenheim Fellowship, a 2013 Absolut Art Writing Award, a 2012 US Artists Fellowship, and a 2003 Herb Alpert Award in the Arts, as well as grants from the Rockefeller Foundation, the NEA and NYFA.

Much of Fusco's interdisciplinary art practice over the last several decades has been concerned with the themes of colonialism, power, race, gender, and history. Her exploration of these themes has culminated in staged performances that concern the embodied experiences of these phenomena, in an effort to destabilize their meanings. She locates her own body not only as the site of their merging but also as their immediate product. She presents and communicates this through her actual performances themselves. In them, she creates and takes on multiple identities to destabilize those identities that have been historically imposed on bodies along colonial, racial, and gendered lines. Fusco also engages with legacies of Cuban exile in her work, as in some of her earlier performances where she stages Catholic rituals and experiences of dislocation.

=== Two Undiscovered Amerindians... ===
In 1992 Fusco created the influential performance piece Two Undiscovered Amerindians Visit the West in collaboration with Guillermo Gómez-Peña. It was first presented at the Plaza Colón in Madrid and Covent Garden in London, then toured to the Australian Museum in Sydney and the Museum of Natural History in New York City. The performance was filmed as part of the documentary The Couple in the Cage, directed by Paula Heredia. During performances of Two Undiscovered Amerindians..., Fusco and Gómez-Peña put themselves on public display in a cage, in a satirical reference to the historical practice of exhibiting human beings as entertainment. They claimed to be natives of an undiscovered island in the Gulf of Mexico, and performed tasks and rituals that were explained by pseudoscientific informational materials posted as part of the performance piece. Audience members were invited to interact with them and could pay to take a photo or see them dance. The work was a critique of colonialism, specifically of the role played by the scientific institutions in which it was performed, and a response to the global quincentenary celebrations of Christopher Columbus's arrival in the Americas.

=== Selected performances ===
- Better Yet When Dead (1997), El Ultimo Deseo (The Last Wish, 1997), and El Evento Suspendido (The Suspended Event, 2000) used the imagery of death and burial to highlight the social restrictions and oppression experienced by women in Latin American countries.
  - Better Yet When Dead (1997): This is the first of several of Fusco's performances that relate death and burial to femininity in order to examine "why Latino cultures...are so fascinated with female creativity once it has been forever silenced. [...] it is almost as if a violent death makes [women artists] more acceptably feminine" (Fusco in Schultz 2008: 16) . Better Yet... was performed twice by Fusco, first in Canada, and again in Colombia, for several hours each day during the three to four day run of the piece. In the performance, Fusco laid silently in a coffin, surrounded by roses and satin. In this performance, she carefully controlled her breathing and movements so as to appear like an actual corpse.
  - El Ultimo Deseo (The Last Wish) (1997): This piece, performed in Cuba at the 1997 Havana Biennial, also involved Fusco playing dead for an audience. In it, she staged a traditional Catholic wake, laying on the floor of a parlor, wrapped in a white sheet and ringed with flowers and tea lights. As in Better Yet, she remained still for the duration of the performance in order to blur the line between life and death. At the threshold of the room where she laid, a sign was posted that bore the name of the performance's title, which refers to the unfulfilled "last wish" of Fusco's own grandmother, as well as many other Cuban exiles, to return to Cuba to be buried.
  - El Evento Suspendido (The Postponed Event) (2000): This performance continues Fusco's exploration of womanhood and death. Like El Ultimo Deseo, it was also performed as part of a Biennial, but this time took place outside of El Espacio Aglutinador, a gallery in Havana. For this performance, as opposed to the two above, Fusco was not performing death itself, but rather burial. She was very much alive and animated in this performance, buried vertically up to her chest in the gallery's lawn, embodying the "belatedness of exile", half-buried in Cuban soil. She remained like this for three hours, beginning at sunset, and rewriting the same letter over and over, offering the copies to observers (below, originally written in Spanish).
    "My dear ones, I am writing this letter to tell you that I am alive. For many years I feared that if I told the truth you would suffer at the hands of those who buried another woman in my name. I can no longer stand not being able to tell you that I exist. Not a day has passed without my dreaming of you. Fortunately I can say that I recovered from the ordeal that resulted in my departure. I will send more news soon. With love, C." This letter is adapted from another of Fusco's works, a one act play entitled The Incredible Disappearing Woman (2000).
- Stuff (1996), a collaboration with Nao Bustamante, took a satirical look at globalism and cultural stereotypes, especially those related to women and food. The piece makes a link between historical references to cannibalism and contemporary geopolitical relationships. Stuff was commissioned by Highway Performance Space and London's Institute of Contemporary Arts, and premiered at the National Review of Live Art in Glasgow before touring internationally.
- Rights of Passage (1997) was created for the Johannesburg Biennale. Fusco performed dressed as a South African policewoman to explore themes of race, identity, and the legacy of apartheid in South Africa.
- Bare Life Study #1 (2005), and A Room of One's Own: Women and Power in the New America (2005) were created in response to the "war on terror" used performance to examine the expanding role of women in the US military and the use of torture in its operations.
- In Observations of Predation In Humans: A Lecture by Dr. Zira, Animal Psychologist (2013), Fusco performed as the primate Dr. Zira from Planet of the Apes, using the perspective of the non-human character to comment on human behavior. The performance was commissioned by The Studio Museum in Harlem and premiered in December 2013.

=== Writing and teaching ===
As a writer, Coco Fusco has focused on gender, race, colonialism, and power structures in Latin America and around the world. Her body of work includes interviews, critical essays, and six published books. Dangerous Moves: Performance and Politics in Cuba (2015) is a history of public space, performance, and identity in Cuba. A Field Guide for Female Interrogators (2008), a companion volume to her performance A Room of One's Own: Women and Power in the New America (2005), examines the sexualized role of women in US military interrogations. A Field Guide for Female Interrogators was shortlisted for the Index on Censorship T. R. Fyvel Book Award. Only Skin Deep: Changing Visions of the American Self (2003, edited with Brian Wallis), is the catalogue for a photography exhibition of the same name, curated by Fusco and Wallis at the International Center of Photography, which looked at racial imagery in photography and the representation of racial attitudes in the United States. The Bodies that Were Not Ours and Other Writings (2001) is a collection of essays and interviews investigating the legacy of colonialism. Corpus Delecti: Performance Art of the Americas (2000) is a scholarly work surveying Latinx and Latin American performance art. In it, Fusco centers the aesthetic and cultural value of artistic expression and works against notions of reducing Latin American performance to "the political". English Is Broken Here: Notes on Cultural Fusion in the Americas (1995) was her first collection of interviews and essays, for which she won the 1995 Critics' Choice award.

Fusco has taught on the arts faculties of Temple University, Columbia University, Parsons School of Design, and MIT. In 2014 she received a Fulbright appointment and served as the Distinguished Chair in the Visual Arts at Fundação Armando Alvares Penteado in São Paulo, Brazil, for one year. Fusco currently serves as the Andrew Banks Endowed Chair at the College of the Arts at University of Florida.

Fusco a recipient of a 2018 Rabkin Prize for Art Criticism.

=== Selected exhibitions ===
- 1987 Havana Postmodern: The New Cuban Art, KCET Latino Consortium and for WNET's Hispanic
- 1990 Norte:Sur, the Mexican Museum, San Francisco
- 1991 La Chavela Realty Company, Brooklyn Academy of Music, Brooklyn, NY
- 1992 Smithsonian Institution, Washington, D.C.
- 1992 Field Museum of Natural History, Chicago, IL
- 1993 The Whitney Biennial, The Whitney Museum of American Art, New York, NY
- Fundacion Banco Patricios, Buenos Aires, Argentina
- 1999 Third International Performance Art Festival, Odense, Denmark Washington State University Museum, Pullman, WA
- 1999 Stuff, Rhode Island School of Design, Providence, RI
- 2000 El Evento Suspendido, El Espacio Aglutinador, Havana, Cuba
- 2003 House of World Cultures, Berlin, Germany
- 2003 The Incredible Disappearing Woman, ICA, London, UK
- 2003 Shanghai Biennial, Shanghai Art Museum, Shanghai, China
- 2005 Collection Remixed: Learning to Read, Bronx Museum, New York, NY
- 2005 Black Panther, Jack Shainman Gallery, New York, NY
- 2006 My Country, The Hungarian Cultural Center, New York, NY
- 2006 A Room of One's Own: Women and Power in the New America, Performance Space 122, New York, NY
- 2007 Killing Time, Exit Art, New York
- 2008 The Project, New York, NY
- 2008 The Whitney Biennial, The Whitney Museum of American Art, New York, NY
- 2012 Art Basel Miami, Miami, FL
- 2012 Contemporary Arts Museum, Houston, Houston, TX
- 2013 Studio Museum in Harlem, New York, NY
- 2013 New Museum, New York, NY
- 2014 Walker Art Center, Minneapolis, MN
- 2015 Venice Biennale, Venice, Italy
- 2016 Alexander Gray Associates, New York, NY
- 2025 I Learned to Swim on Dry Land, MACBA Museu d'Art Contemporani de Barcelona, Barcelona, Spain
- 2025 Coco Fusco: Tomorrow I Will Become an Island, El Museo del Barrio, New York, NY
- 2025 Coco Fusco: Your Eyes Will Be an Empty Word, Art Institute of Chicago, Chicago, IL
- 2026 This is America: Selections from PAMM's Collection, Pérez Art Museum Miami, FL

== Awards ==
- Anonymous Was A Woman Award (2021)
- American Academy of Arts and Letters Arts Award (2021)
- Free Speech Defender Award (2023)

== Public collections (selection) ==
- Pérez Art Museum Miami
- Museum of Modern Art, New York

== Selected videos ==
Coco Fusco works distributed by the Video Data Bank include:

- La Botella al Mar de María Elena (The Message in a Bottle from María Elena) (2015) 44:00, color, sound.
- La Confesion (2015), 30:00, color, sound.
- Operation Atropos (2006), 59:00 min, color, sound
- a/k/a Mrs. George Gilbert (2004), 31:00 min, B&W, sound
- Pochonovela: A Chicano Soap Opera (1996), 26:38 min, color, sound
- The Couple in the Cage: Guatianaui Odyssey (1993), 31:00 min, B&W and color, sound

== Bibliography ==
- Allatson, Paul. "Coco Fusco, Guillermo Gómez-Peña, and 'American' Cannibal Reveries." In Latino Dreams: Transcultural Traffic and the U.S. National Imaginary. Amsterdam and New York: Rodopi Press, 2002.
- Amich, Candice. "Playing Dead in Cuba: Coco Fusco's Stagings of Dissensus." Theatre Research International, vol. 34, no. 3, Oct. 2009, pp. 267–277. ISSN 0307-8833
- Becker, Carl L. The Subversive Imagination: Artists, Society, and Responsibility. New York: Routledge, 1994.
- Cenini, Martha. "Coco Fusco's Room: Rethinking Feminism after Guantanamo". n.paradoxa vol. 30, 2012.
- Copeland, Colette. "Art, Gender, Power, and the F Word: An Interview with Coco Fusco." Afterimage, vol. 35, no. 5, Mar/Apr2008, pp. 4–6. ISSN 0300-7472
- Cotter, Holland. "Caught on Video: Fantasy Interrogation, Real Tension". The New York Times. May 30, 2006, Section E/Column 1, p. 3.
- Fusco, Coco. English is Broken Here. New York: The New Press, 1995.
- Fusco, Coco (editor). Corpus Delecti: Performance Art of the Americas. London and New York: Routledge, 2000.
- Fusco, Coco. Only Skin Deep: Changing Visions of the American Self. New York: International Center of Photography in Association with Harry N. Abrams, Inc. Publishers, 2003.
- Fusco, Coco. A Field Guide for Female Interrogators, New York, Seven Stories Press, 2008
- Fusco, Coco. Dangerous Moves: Performance and Politics in Cuba, Tate Publishing, 2015
- Jones, Amelia. Performing the Body/Performing the Text. London and New York: Routledge, 1999.
- Wallace, Brian. Art Matters: How the Culture Wars Changed America. New York: New York University Press, 1999.
- Wallace, Michele. Black Popular Culture. New York: New Press, 1998.
- Warr, Tracy. The Artist's Body. London: Phaidon, 2000.
- Fusco, Coco. Pasos peligrosos. Performance y política en Cuba España: Turner, 2017. ISBN 9788416714421
