= Spill Festival =

Performance festival of UK

SPILL Festival is an artist-led biennial of theatre and live art in the UK that takes place in various venues in London and Ipswich, England. The festival was originally produced as the SPILL Festival of Performance by Pacitti Company under Artistic Director Robert Pacitti until 2021. Since then, Robin Deacon has served as the Artistic Director, beginning in 2021.

Launched in 2007, SPILL Festival presents internationally significant and groundbreaking work in the fields of performance, live art, and experimental theatre. The festival has become a major platform for both established and emerging artists, with a strong emphasis on innovation, accessibility, and community engagement.

SPILL runs a year-round programme of events and activities through the SPILL Think Tank, a Victorian Art School located next to Ipswich Museum. This space hosts exhibitions, talks, performances, and the Think Tank Live series, which showcases contemporary performance and interdisciplinary work. SPILL's robust artist development programme supports creatives through residencies, mentorships, commissions, and associate opportunities.

Over the years, the festival has been presented in prominent venues across London and Ipswich, including the Barbican, Southbank Centre, National Theatre Studio, Soho Theatre, Shunt Vaults, Shoreditch Town Hall, Greenwich Dance, Laban, Soho Square, Toynbee Studios, DanceEast and Ipswich Cornhill.

The SPILL National Platform and Showcase was held every two years Ipswich, featuring early-career artists selected through an open call. This initiative highlighted new voices in live art, experimental performance, and socially engaged practices, providing a launchpad for emerging talent in the UK and beyond. SPILL now runs a year-round Artist Residency programme.

== Artists ==
=== Spill Festival 2007 ===
Productions have included:

- Covet Me, Care for Me, Sheila Ghelani
- Trans: Acts, Julia Bardsley
- Collected Works, Eve Dent
- Ringside, Mem Morrison
- Sacred, The Rite of Spring, Raimund Hoghe
- Three Duets, Pacitti Company

=== Spill Festival 2009 ===
At SPILL Festival 2009 there were approximately 100 live performances by artists from Australia, Belgium, Germany, Italy, the U.S. and from across the UK.

Spill Festival 2009

- Paradiso by Romeo Castellucci, Italy
- Inferno by Romeo Castellucci, Italy
- Dinner With America, Rajni Shah, UK
- That Night follows Day, Victoria & Tim Etchells (Forced Entertainment), Belgium/UK
- A Forest, Pacitti Company, UK
- Purgatorio, By Romeo Castellucci, Italy
- Saving the World, Gob Squad, Germany/UK
- Visions of Excess, Ron Athey & Lee Adams, USA/UK
- A True Story About Two People, Julie Tolentino, USA
- Listen, My Secret Fetish, Richard Haynes, Australia
- Aftermaths: A Tear in the Meat of Vision, Julia Bardsley, UK
- The Modes of Al-Ikseer, Harminder Singh Judge, UK
- Tears of Eros, Carla Esperanza Tommasini, Italy/UK
- The Porcelain Project, Grace Ellen Barkey and Needcompany, Belgium
- Look mummy, I’m dancing, Vanessa, Belgium
- Kim Noble Will Die, Kim Noble, UK
- Orgy of Tolerance, Jan Fabre, Belgium
- Prototypes, Robin Deacon, UK
- Void Story, Forced Entertainment, UK
- Intermission, Pacitti Company, UK
- I Feel Love!, George Chakravarthi, UK

=== Spill Festival 2011 ===
- Glorious, Rajni Shah
- Do What Thou Wilt, Harminder Judge
- I Guess If The Stage Exploded, Sylvia Rimat
- In Eldersfield Chapter 1, Kings of England
- Body House Version 1, Shabnam Shabazi (UK)
- Unto Us A Child is Born, Rachel Mars
- Foley, Jo Bannon
- A Sense of the World, Darren White

=== SPILL Festival 2023 ===
Held from 13–22 October 2023 in Ipswich, the festival featured performances and projects by international and UK-based artists. Highlights included:

- Mega Bunny and Friends – Bruce Asbestos
- Monumental Construction – Olivier Grossetête (France/UK), large-scale cardboard architecture built with public participation
- 50 Dangerous Things (You Should Let Your Children Do) – interactive family event based on the book by Gever Tulley
- friend – Gillie Kleiman (UK), collaborative dance performances in the private homes of Ipswich residents
- Ecdysis (ritual) – Alethia Antonia (UK), dance piece exploring transformation
- I guess you have a lot of questions – Maritea Dæhlin (Norway/Mexico), solo performance on language and identity

=== SPILL Festival 2024 ===
In 2024, SPILL presented Think Tank Live, a series of performances, talks, and exhibitions held at the SPILL Think Tank space in Ipswich. Highlights included:

- White Balance: A History of Colour Photography – Robin Deacon (US/UK)
- The Sonic Commons – Mike Challis (UK), immersive sound performance
- Lines of Resistance – Elly Clarke (UK/Germany), performance on digital identity and surveillance

The SPILL Artist Development Programme also supported new work through artist residencies:

- Esme Podmore – development of a new visual/performance piece
- Maria Garcia – interdisciplinary residency focused on movement and live art

=== SPILL Festival 2025 ===
Highlights of SPILL Festival 2025 included:

- Personal – Jodee Mundy (Australia), a show reflecting on the artist’s experience growing up as the only hearing member of a Deaf family (CODA)
- Immaterial Terrain – Emily Richardson (UK), film screening documenting a year in the life of a British coastal landscape, scheduled for 5 June 2025
- Leviathan - SPILL's flagship international commission by Mark Pozlep imagined a dialogue between Suffolk's fishermen and the colossal Leviathan.
- Steli - A large, interactive outdoor work by Stalker Teatro

== SPILL Salons ==
Spill Salons were public space which bring groups of people together along with a ‘Thinker-in-Residence’ to look at some of the over-riding themes within the Festival. The public salons are where experts from a range of different territories discuss relevant issues affecting performance.
