= Site Gallery =

Art gallery in Sheffield, England

Coordinates: 53°22′35.9″N 1°27′58.2″W

- Site Gallery at 1 Brown Street

- Location within Sheffield
- Established: 1979; 47 years ago
- Location: 1 Brown Street, Sheffield, England
- Website: www.sitegallery.org

Site Gallery is an art gallery in Sheffield, England. It specialises in moving image, new media and performance based art.

Site Gallery is based at Brown Street in Sheffield's Cultural Industries Quarter. It is an international centre for contemporary art, and has extensive programme of exhibitions, conferences, artists talks and festivals. The gallery's exhibitions often coincide with a public programme including artist talks, symposia, screenings, workshops and reading groups. It was originally called Untitled Gallery.

Sharna Jackson has been in post as artistic director since July 2018, co-directing alongside Judith Harry.

== Details ==
Site Gallery is a registered charity. (Note: Its charity registration number is 510322.) It must raise the funds to deliver exhibitions, event and produce events. It was founded officially in 1979 with a funding grant from Yorkshire Arts (Arts Council England) and began as an independent photography gallery in the Walkley area of Sheffield in 1978. During the period between 1979 and 1985 the gallery expanded to offer space for workshops, offices and darkrooms, whilst touring exhibitions throughout Britain. In 1988, the gallery moved to 1 Brown Street under the guidance of gallery director Matthew Conduit. In 1995 the gallery expanded to incorporate new digital and multimedia work alongside its traditional image production. In 1996 the gallery changed its name to Site Gallery. In July 2014 the gallery secured funding from the Arts Council to redevelop the building and increase the size of the galleries.

A shop in Site Gallery stocks products made by artists and designers as well as a variety of magazines and greetings cards.

Site Gallery exhibits work by nationally and internationally based artists, commissioned new work or UK premieres, of international standard as well as emergent talent. The programme maintains a balance between photography, installation, electronic media and film and video work. The gallery has hosted individual shows of high-profile artists, including the first UK solo show of Sophie Calle. Other events have included exhibitions by Susan Hiller, Breda Beban, Mat Collishaw, George Chakravarthi, Susan Philipsz and Paul Rooney, Marie-Jo Lafontaine, and Wendy McMurdo. Other UK premieres at Site Gallery include those by Forced Entertainment and Lovebytes. In 2003, Site Gallery premiered six new commissions in the crossover area between performance, digital media and installation, "Shooting Live Artists", in association with the Arts Council of England and BTV festival. Mike Kelley's Mobile Homestead Videos (the artists' final work) was exhibited at Site Gallery in July 2013.

Site Gallery has a residency programme, Site Platform, for UK-based visual artists.

Site Gallery's education programme is about working with young people from across South Yorkshire to inspire involvement and enjoyment in contemporary art. In 2009 Site Gallery launched the Site Young Apprentice Scheme (SYAS) which gives 14- to 21-year-olds from across South Yorkshire the opportunity to study the arts sector by working closely with the gallery through a variety of creative activities and projects. Past projects have involved Hatfield Visual Arts College, Aston Comprehensive, Sheffield Young Writer Groups, Cube Magazine, Rotherham Young Writers, Sheffield Hallam University and Doncaster, Rotherham and Sheffield Colleges.
