= Stuart Sherman =

Stuart Sherman may refer to:

- Stuart P. Sherman (1881–1926), American literary critic, educator and journalist
- Stuart Sherman (artist) (1945–2001), American performance artist, filmmaker, writer, sculptor and collagist
