= George Chakravarthi =

Multi-disciplinary artist

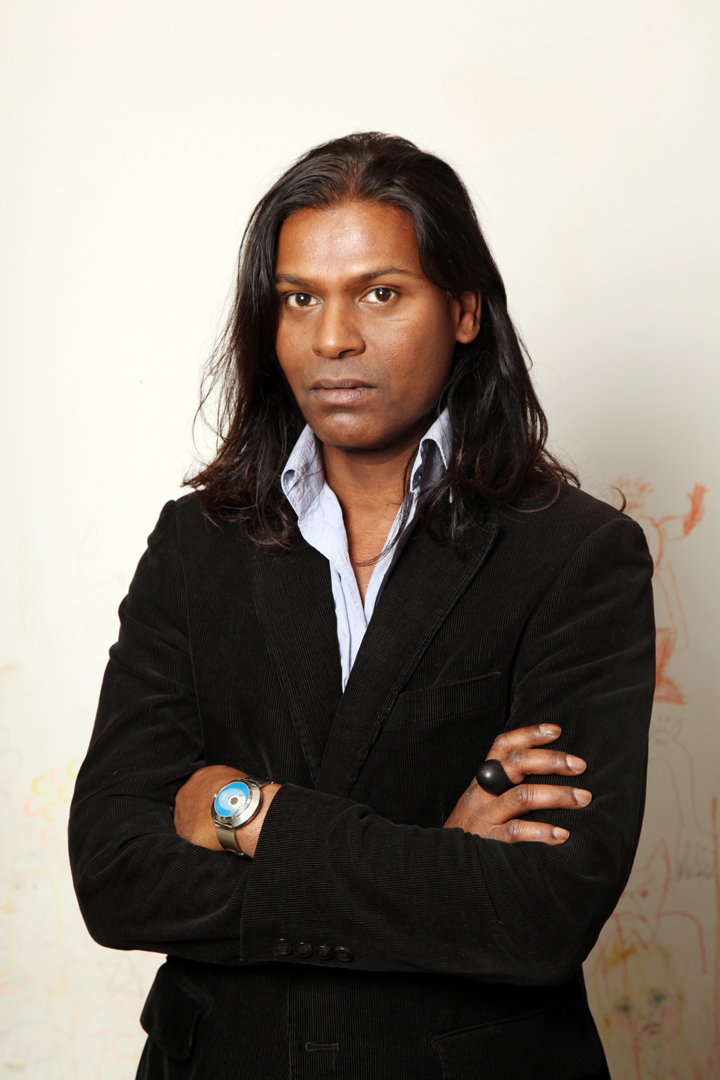
- Born: 26 November 1969; New Delhi, India
- Occupation: Artist
- Years active: 1998 to present
- Website: www.georgechakravarthi.com

George Chakravarthi is a British multi-disciplinary artist working with photography, video, painting and performance. His work addresses the politics of identity including race, sexuality and gender, and also religious iconography among other subjects. He was born in India and moved to London, England in 1980.

He has exhibited and performed all over the UK and internationally at venues including Site Gallery, Sheffield, England; Tate Modern, London, England; Victoria and Albert Museum, London, England; Künstlerhaus Mousonturm, Frankfurt, Germany; Dance Academy (Tilburg), Tilburg, Netherlands; Queens Gallery, British Council, New Delhi, India; La Casa Encendida, Madrid, Spain; Brut Künstlerhaus, Vienna, Austria; Abrons Arts Center, New York City, USA; and City Art Gallery, Ljubljana, Slovenia.

Chakravarthi has been commissioned by the BBC, Artangel, Duckie, InIVA, the Arts Council of England, the British Council, the SPILL Festival of Performance, the Live Art Development Agency, the Shakespeare Birthplace Trust and the Royal Shakespeare Company.

Chakravarthi studied at the University of Brighton, the Royal Academy of Arts and the Royal College of Art.

== Early life ==
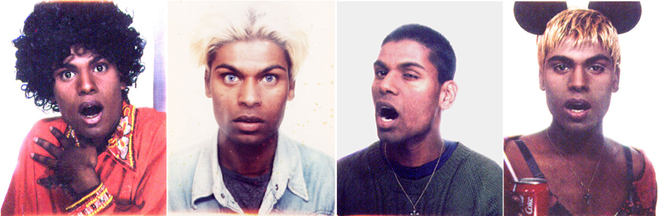
Early photo booth self-portraits by Chakravarthi

Chakravarthi was born in New Delhi, India on 26 November 1969 to parents with origins in Tamil Nadu, India and British Burma. His parents considered the education of their children a priority, so the family lived very modestly in order for him and his siblings to be privately educated while in India. Chakravarthi attended St. Columba's School, Delhi, an English-medium school run by a Roman Catholic brotherhood (Congregation of Christian Brothers). Although nominally brought up as a Catholic, Chakravarthi's family encouraged him to absorb and be influenced by Hinduism and Buddhism.

In 1980, Chakravarthi moved with his family to the UK. This was around the time of the Brixton and other riots, and the peaks for organised racism and electoral success of the far-right (National Front General election results in May 1979). Mary Brennan, reviewing the National Review of Live Art in 2001, described the effect on Chakravarthi of his move to the UK as follows:

[He] entered into a kind of mirror-maze, where he found himself searching for a sense of who he was. In time, that quest for identity has embraced issues of iconography, sexuality, race, and gender – all framed, as it were, within a personal reconstruction of familiar fine art.

— Mary Brennan

He continued his education at St. Patrick's Primary School and St. Paul's Secondary School in south London, both Roman Catholic, multi-cultural schools. He began documenting his reactions to his new environment and his changing identity through writing and drawing, and then making photographic self-portraits (initially using photo booths until he was given a camera by the sculptor and photographer Hamish Horsley).

Chakravarthi left home at the age of 16 and eventually settled in a modest flat in Greenwich, London. He had a variety of jobs including stacking shelves in supermarkets, as a go-go dancer in various nightclubs and as a photographic and artist's model. He attended a short course in photography at the Thames Independent Photography Project (TIPP) where his interest in photography and particularly making self-portraits was encouraged.

== Formal training ==
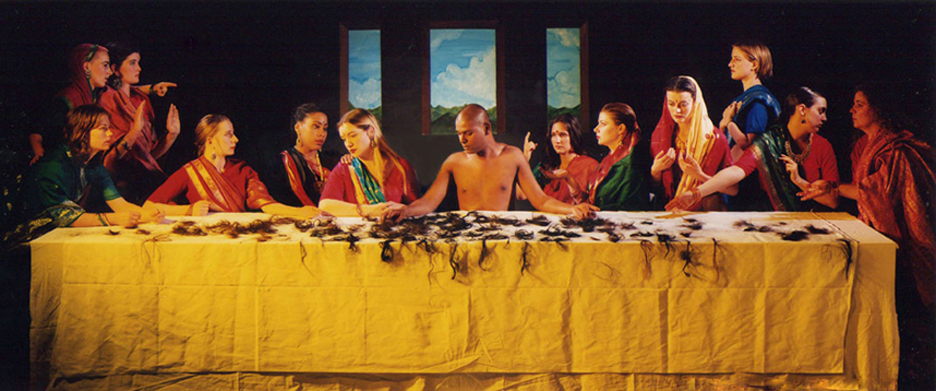
'Resurrection' by Chakravarthi

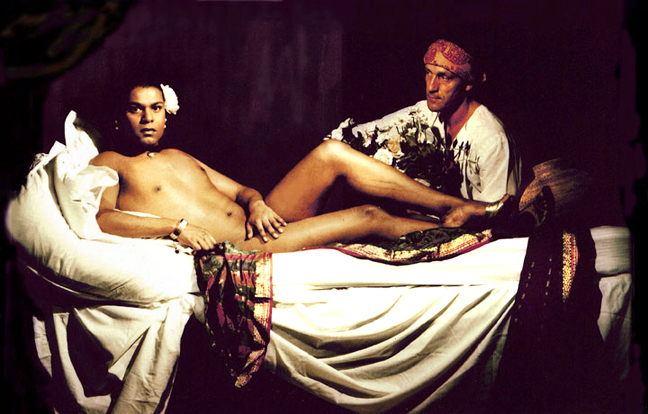
'Olympia' by Chakravarthi

Chakravarthi was an undergraduate at the University of Brighton. He obtained a first-class Bachelor of Arts in Visual and Performance Art. For the degree show he submitted ′Resurrection′ (a photograph 12 feet by 5 feet) and a live performance, the subject of both was The Last Supper, with Chakravarthi in the place of Jesus and women dressed in saris in the positions of the disciples, as depicted by Leonardo da Vinci. He received an award from Nagoya University for outstanding artistic achievement.

He started his postgraduate studies at the Royal Academy of Arts and, after taking a year out, he completed his Master of Arts at the Royal College of Art in 2003. For the final show at the Royal College of Art, he submitted ′Olympia′, a video installation based on the painting by Édouard Manet, with Chakravarthi in the position of the nude woman and a white man in the place of the black servant woman; it won him the Chris Garnham Award for 'Best Use of Photography'.

== Career ==
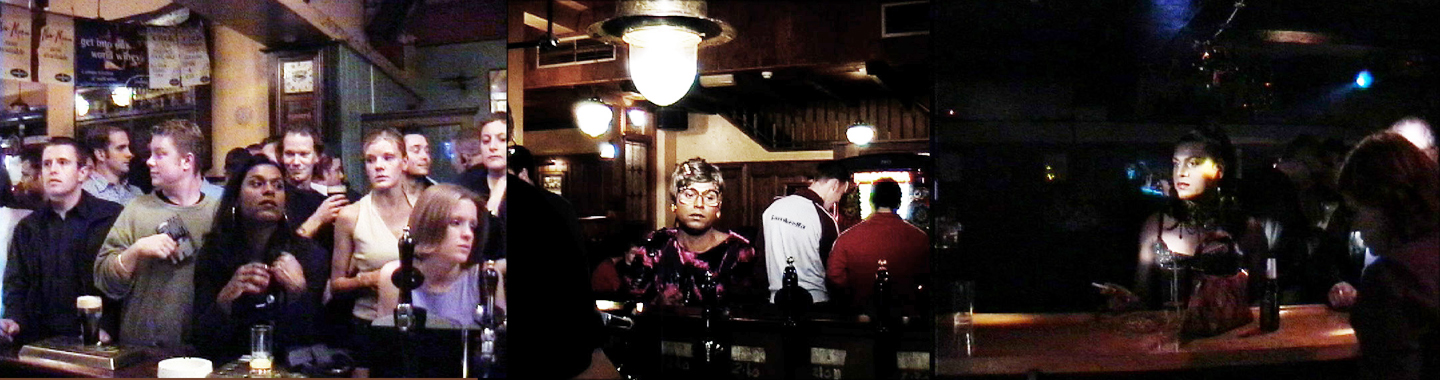
'Barflies' by Chakravarthi

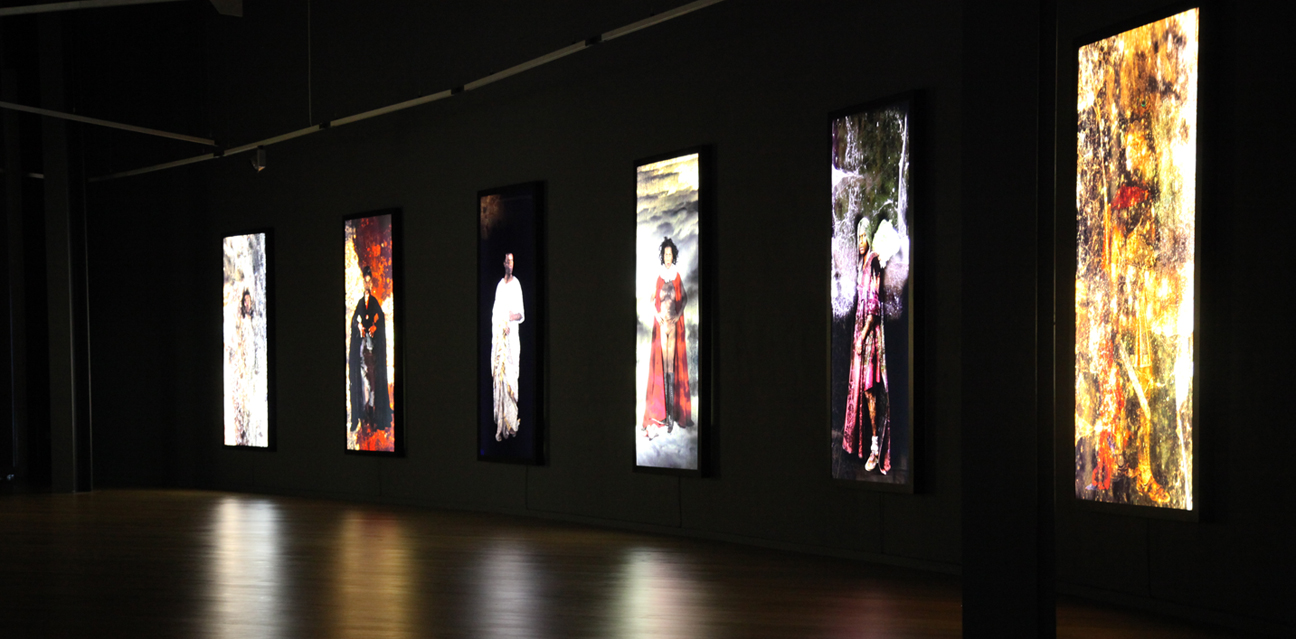
'Thirteen' by Chakravarthi

Name of work/ Type	Date/ Commission	Exhibitions or performances	Description
Remotecontrol (Video installation)	1997	2002 part of 'Third Sex' solo show, Site Gallery, Sheffield; 2003 part of 'George Chakravarthi – a solo show', Sketch, London	Chakravarthi as an androgynous person inspired by fashion photography and the politics of an 'ideal body'.
Memorabilia/Aradhana (Video installation)	1998	1998 National Review of Live Art, Glasgow; 1999 Dance Academy (Tilburg), Tilburg, Netherlands; 2002 part of 'Third Sex' solo show, Site Gallery, Sheffield; 2003 part of 'George Chakravarthi – a solo show', Sketch, London; 2003/4 The Big M National Tour (ISIS Arts, Newcastle upon Tyne), UK	An homage to Bollywood cinema. Chakravarthi plays both characters and it reflects the typical style and content of popular Indian cinema of the 1980s. However, the subtitles confront sexist assumptions and patriarchy.
Genesis (Video installation)	1998	1998 National Review of Live Art, Glasgow; 1999 Dance Academy (Tilburg), Tilburg, Netherlands; 2002 part of 'Third Sex' solo show, Site Gallery, Sheffield; 2003 part of 'George Chakravarthi – a solo show', Sketch, London; 2007 Free To Air screening	Filmed in real-time, Chakravarthi reveals a series of emotions from happiness to extreme sadness. "[A] large-scale video projection of face and upper body, proudly showcases the artist's body, while offering a more intimate emotional aspect, which destabilises Western codes of behaviour." – Fine Art Visiting Speaker Forum
Introjection (Video installation)	1998	1998 National Review of Live Art, Glasgow; 2002 part of 'Third Sex' solo show, Site Gallery, Sheffield; 2003 part of 'George Chakravarthi – a solo show', Sketch, London	"A short film about narcissism, identity, self-image, internal reflection and loss." – George Chakravarthi
Resurrection (Live performance)	1998	1998 National Review of Live Art, Glasgow; 1999 Dance Academy (Tilburg), Tilburg, Netherlands	Chakravarthi, with a shaved head and naked, takes the position of Jesus in the Last Supper tableau as painted by Leonardo da Vinci, and he is accompanied by twelve female disciples wearing saris. Hair is strewn over the table.
Resurrection (Photographic)	1998	1999 Bonington Gallery, Nottingham Trent University, Nottingham; 2004/5 British Council, tour of India	Still image of posed version of the live performance above.
Shakti (Video installation)	2000	2001 National Review of Live Art, Glasgow; 2002 part of 'Map Making', Bath Festival, Bath; 2004/5 British Council, tour of India; 2007 Site Gallery, Sheffield	Chakravarthi as an hybrid combination of Mona Lisa and the Indian goddess Kali with a landscape of naked women in the background.
Barflies (Triptych video installation)	2002 BBC and Arts Council of England	2002 Saatchi & Saatchi, London; 2002 part of 'Third Sex' solo show, Site Gallery, Sheffield; 2003 part of 'George Chakravarthi – a solo show', Sketch, London; 2004 Gardner Arts Centre, University of Sussex, Brighton; 2005 La Casa Encendida, Madrid; 2006 Tate Modern, London; 2013 City of Women Festival, Ljubljana, Slovenia; 2018 - 2019 LADA Screens (online screening); 2020 LADA Summer Programme (online screening)	Chakravarthi as three specific types of transgender women filmed in bars with a soundtrack of conversations on a telephone chat line between the artist and other transvestites and those that seek them. "George Chakravarthi is what is politely known as a bundle of contradictions... The sequence follows his alter egos through three phases of transvestism, from frumpy to flirty and fetishistic... In the first piece, Chakravarthi seems to have raided a charity shop in a bid to look like his mum... In the final sequence, Chakravarthi slips into a slinky corset and... we see him confidently seducing inebriated men, having progressed from housewife to hooker in three easy stages." – Alfred Hickling
Great Expectations (Live performance with video)	2002	2002 Liverpool Biennial, Liverpool	Chakravarthi sitting with his back to the audience in front of a video projection also showing the back of his head.
Olympia (Video installation)	2003	2003 Royal College of Art, London; 2004/5 British Council, tour of India; 2005 Kunstbanken, Hamar, Norway; 2007 Big Screen, Cornerhouse, Manchester; 2009 Victoria and Albert Museum, London	"Chakravarthi is seen as 'Olympia', a sexually ambiguous figure, dark, transfixed and oblivious to his/her white, male servant. The tension between the two characters is filled with ambiguity too, suggesting emotions of, love, hate, lust and obsession." – Cornerhouse, Manchester
To the Man in my Dreams (Installation and live performance)	2006 Artangel	2006 Comptons, Soho, London (live), Bethnal Green Town Hall, London (exhibition) and Madame Jojo's, Soho, London (interviewed by Neil Bartlett)	A collaborative project with members of SW5, a London advice and information service for male, female and transgender sex workers (now known as SWISH). A collection of letters between someone who calls himself 'father' and 'George'.
Masking (Film)	2009 Live Art Development Agency	Not applicable	Short film produced to celebrate LADA's tenth anniversary. "′Masking′ is an investigation of the visual creation and identification of archetypal and racially motivated images in pornography... This short film of 'The Blonde' and 'The Black Diva' is a study of some of the reoccurring stereotypes in pornography." – LADA
I Feel Love! (Durational live performance)	2009 SPILL Festival of Performance	2009 Soho Square, London	An outdoor performance lasting all day that examines ways in which the body is traditionally portrayed in public sculpture, memorials and popular culture.
Ode to a Dark Star (Video installation)	2009 Shakespeare Birthplace Trust	2009 Shakespeare Birthplace Trust, Stratford upon Avon	Chakravarthi in costume as both Shakespeare and the 3rd Earl of Southampton in a looped video displayed in a frame, giving the impression of a painting with some motion. The Cobbe portrait of Shakespeare was shown for the first time in the same exhibition (Shakespeare Found: a Life Portrait). There is also a Cobbe portrait of Southampton.
George Chakravarthi UnSeen (DVD)	2009 Live Art Development Agency	Not applicable	A slide-show of early, photographic self-portraits by Chakravarthi. The photographs show him experimenting with his identity; they represent the earliest documentation of the experiences which inform much of his current work. The soundtrack is a conversation between Chakravarthi and Andrew Mitchelson in which Chakravarthi talks about his childhood experiences in India and London, and about feeling an outsider as far as both cultures are concerned.
Negrophilia (Live performance)	2010 Duckie	2010 Duckie, Royal Vauxhall Tavern, London; 2014 ALAG: A Live Art Gala (celebration of 15th Anniversary of the Live Art Development Agency (LADA)), Royal Vauxhall Tavern, London; 2014 Brut Künstlerhaus, Vienna, Austria; 2015 Abrons Arts Center, New York City (part of LADA's 'Just Like A Woman: NYC Edition Programme'); 2015 Chelsea Theatre, London (part of LADA's 'Just Like A Woman: London Edition Programme'); 2015 The Citadel, St Helens, Merseyside (part of Duckie's 'Twenty First Century Music Hall')	Negrophilia is inspired by the Parisian avant-garde culture of the 1920s and its fascination with Africanism (Negrophilia), Hollywood cinema's negative portrayals of Africa and Africans in the same era and the performer Josephine Baker. Chakravarthi reveals himself dressed, as Baker famously did, in a banana skirt and pearls. "Good art makes you see the world differently – whether it's George Chakravarthi shimmying in drag from inside a gorilla suit at ALAG, or Turner's spectacular landscapes hanging in the Tate." – Mary Paterson ″George Chakravarthi's dance performance in which he transforms from an ape to a chorus girl, skewering the histories of racism, evolution and exhibitionism in one long, seductive move″ – Mary Paterson
Thirteen (Photographic – comprises 13 separate images)	2011 Royal Shakespeare Company	2011 Swan Room, Royal Shakespeare Theatre, Stratford upon Avon; 2014 Impressions Gallery, Bradford; 2015 Vane Gallery, Newcastle upon Tyne; 2015 Globe Gallery, Pilgrim Street, Newcastle upon Tyne	Self-portraits of Chakravarthi in costume as thirteen Shakespeare characters (male and female) who committed suicide. Each image is layered with textures including cobwebs, mould, stone, water and clouds. Backlit transparencies in light boxes, characters about life-size. "Suicide might be the theme but it is difficult not to feel uplifted by the beauty of these images." – David Whetstone
Miss UK (an archive) (Live performance in three parts)	2011 Duckie	2011 Duckie, Royal Festival Hall, London	A dance floor posing piece that celebrates the glamour and absurdity of beauty contests in the UK from the 1960s to the 90s (such as Miss United Kingdom).
Andhaka (Live performance)	2013 Live Art Development Agency	2013 City of Women Festival, Ljubljana, Slovenia	A one-to-one durational performance. Chakravarthi is present in darkness and is finally revealed in a flood of light as Kali, the Hindu goddess of destruction and creation. "reaction[s] to the performance came in extremes... most... emotional, often tearful, some tapped into their own fears and... felt threatened... Both reactions were... integral to the work." – George Chakravarthi
Barflies (Photographic)	2014	Not applicable	Edition of fifteen, signed sets of three prints based on the 2002 video installation Barflies (see above). Produced for the Live Art Development Agency's 15th Anniversary Limited Editions series.
The Ambidextrous Universe (Photographic)	2015	2015 House of St Barnabas, Soho, London	Six self-portraits, which are the first pieces of work emerging from Chakravarthi's current and ongoing research known as The Ambidextrous Universe. The images explore symmetry and emphasise the fractal construction of objects in nature and religious architecture.
Border Force - I Did ′India′ (Performance installation)	2015 Duckie	2015 Camden Centre, Camden Town Hall, London (27 June 2015); 2015 Brighton Dome, Brighton (1 August 2015)	Performance installation as part of a Duckie 'geo-political-immersive-disko' confronting xenophobia and promoting freedom of movement. "UK nationals have freedom of movement to 174 countries and territories (89% of the countries of the world), ranking the British passport 1st (tied with Finnish, German, Swedish and the US). By comparison, having an Afghanistan passport gives you free access to just 28... Although ancient Indian culture offers many examples of same sex love and, for example, the veneration of transgendered gods, homosexuality in India was criminalised (under British rule) in the 1860s. The law may not be enforced and India has seen a smattering of same sex weddings but there is no legislation in place to protect LGBTQI rights. The ‘Gay Happiness Index’ which measured acceptance of same-sex relationships in 127 countries of the world, put ... India 81st..." – Joshua Sofaer
Let Them Eat Cake (Performance installation)	2016 Duckie	24 and 25 June 2016, Bishopsgate Institute, 230 Bishopsgate, London	Performance installation as part of Duckie's 'Lady Malcolm's Servants' Ball'. Chakravarthi, as Marie Antoinette, hand feeds slices of a cake decorated with a map of the British Empire to members of the audience - referencing feasts and famines across the British Empire.
Negrophilia (Film screening)	2016	30 November 2016 TRANS LIVE ART SALON at the Live Collision International Festival, Dublin; 9 to 19 February 2017 IBT17 Bristol International Festival, Bristol	
Mata Bahucharaji (Goddess of Eunuchs) (Painting)	2016	Stonewall Season (fundraising auction event, to stand by the side of all LGBT people worldwide)	
An Indian in a Box (Performance installation)	2021 Duckie	6 to 10 September 2021, Vauxhall Pleasure Gardens, London; 14 to 15 July 2022, Birmingham Botanical Gardens, Birmingham; 6 October 2022, City Art Gallery, Ljubljana, Slovenia	Live, durational performance installation as part of Duckie's 'Princess: The Promenade Performance', inspired by the queer history of Georgian London. Chakravarthi presents issues of enslavement, voyeurism, fetishisation and isolation as experienced by the victims of Human Zoos, also known as Ethnological Expositions - a shameful practice that endured during the colonial era, which continued into the 1950s, and as late as the 1990s in some countries across Europe. Captured and encased in a glass cabinet, Chakravarthi, in Georgian gentleman's attire, presents himself as a living object of curiosity and an exoticised creature. The performance in Slovenia was part of the 'International Festival of Contemporary Arts – City of Women', Chakravarthi was dressed in Slovene national costume.
AUM (Site-specific, multi-media project - video, sound and photography )	2022 Nomad Projects	September and October 2022, Phytology, Bethnal Green Nature Reserve, Tower Hamlets, London	New body of work exploring Indian spiritual and tribal practices instigated while being the artist in residence at Phytology throughout 2022. See the image below of the billboard launching the work.
AUM (Publication)	2022 Nomad Projects	Signed limited edition folio box featuring artworks titled Brahma, Vishnu, Shiva ^{(bottom of the page)}; Included in the Wellcome Collection	Nine printed artworks (210 × 210 mm), printed on German etching paper, hand-mounted on 2 mm board, one printed text sheet on ‘wallpaper’ grade inkjet paper, digital print, 210 × 690 mm. Handmade box and cover sheet, 230 mm square box with clamshell lid 25 mm thick, no inner wall. Brown book cloth outer, orange book cloth inner, foil-blocked in gold on the lid and spine.
The Ascension of the Bearded Lady (Performance installation)	2023 Duckie	1 July 2023, Finsbury Circus Gardens, London	Live, durational performance installation as part of the 'Duckie Summer Fete'.
Self-Portrait As An Unknown Devadasi (Photograph)	2023	July 2023 - January 2024, The Kennedy Gallery, Scarborough Museum, Toronto, Canada	Part of the exhibition ‘Oor’ and produced by The Queer Tamil Collective

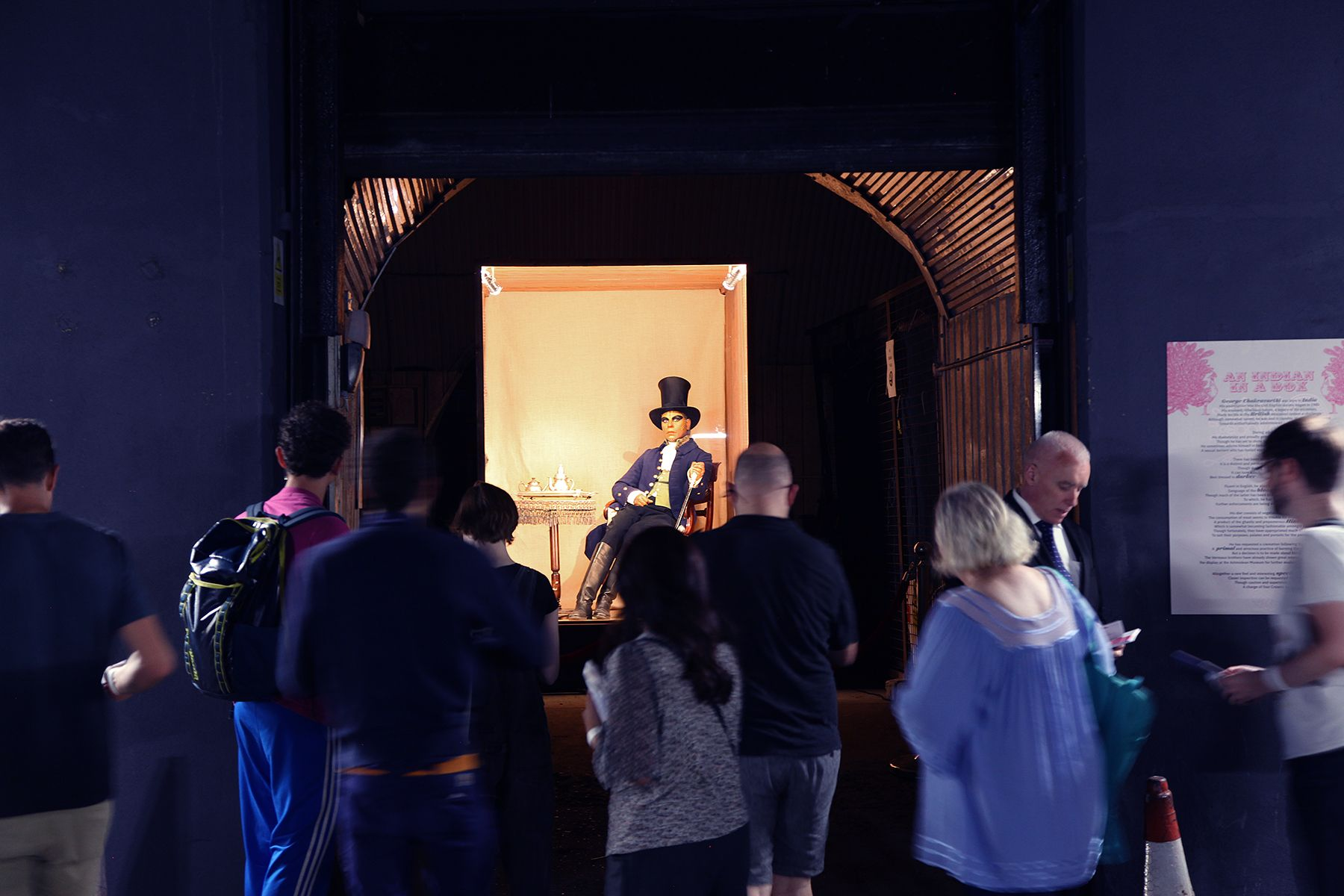
'An Indian in a Box' London performance

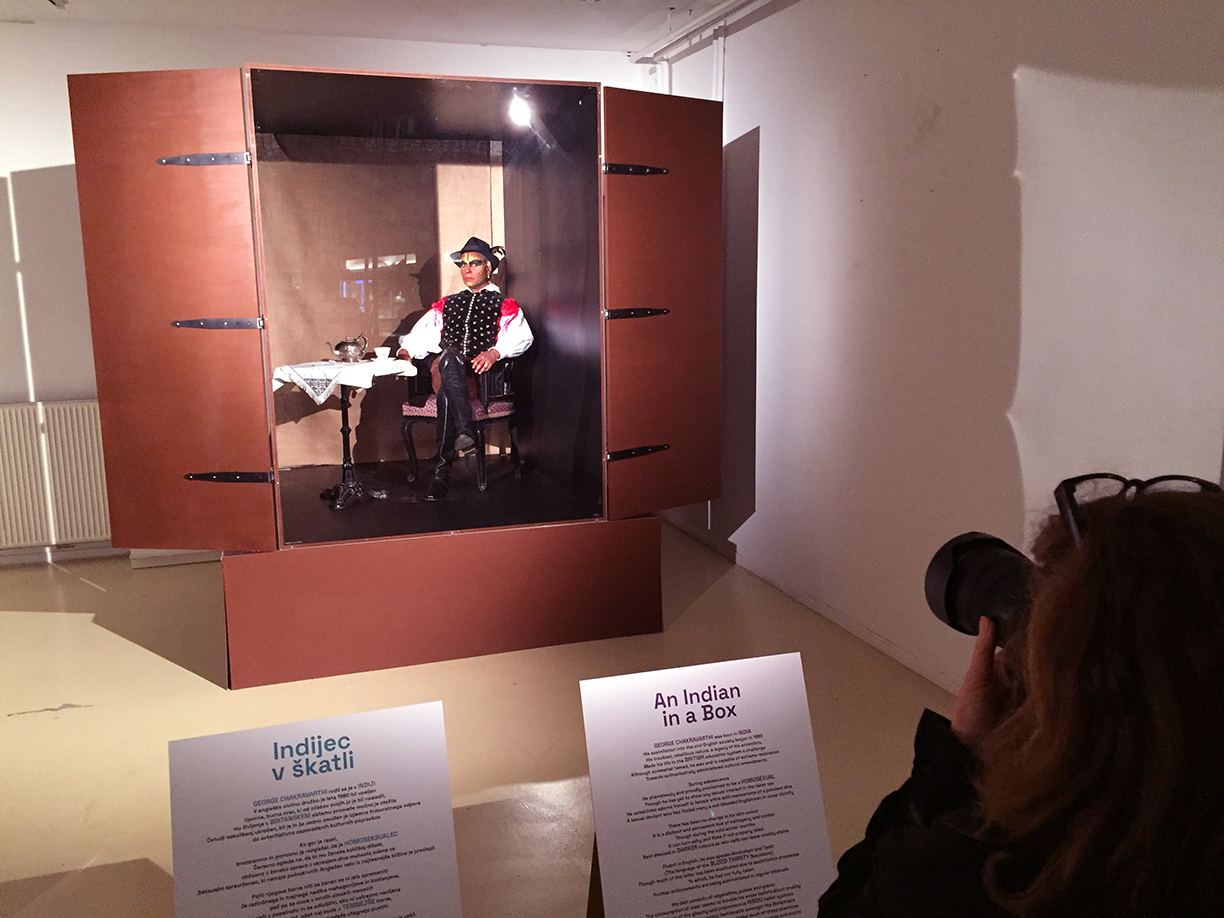
'An Indian in a Box' Ljubljana performance

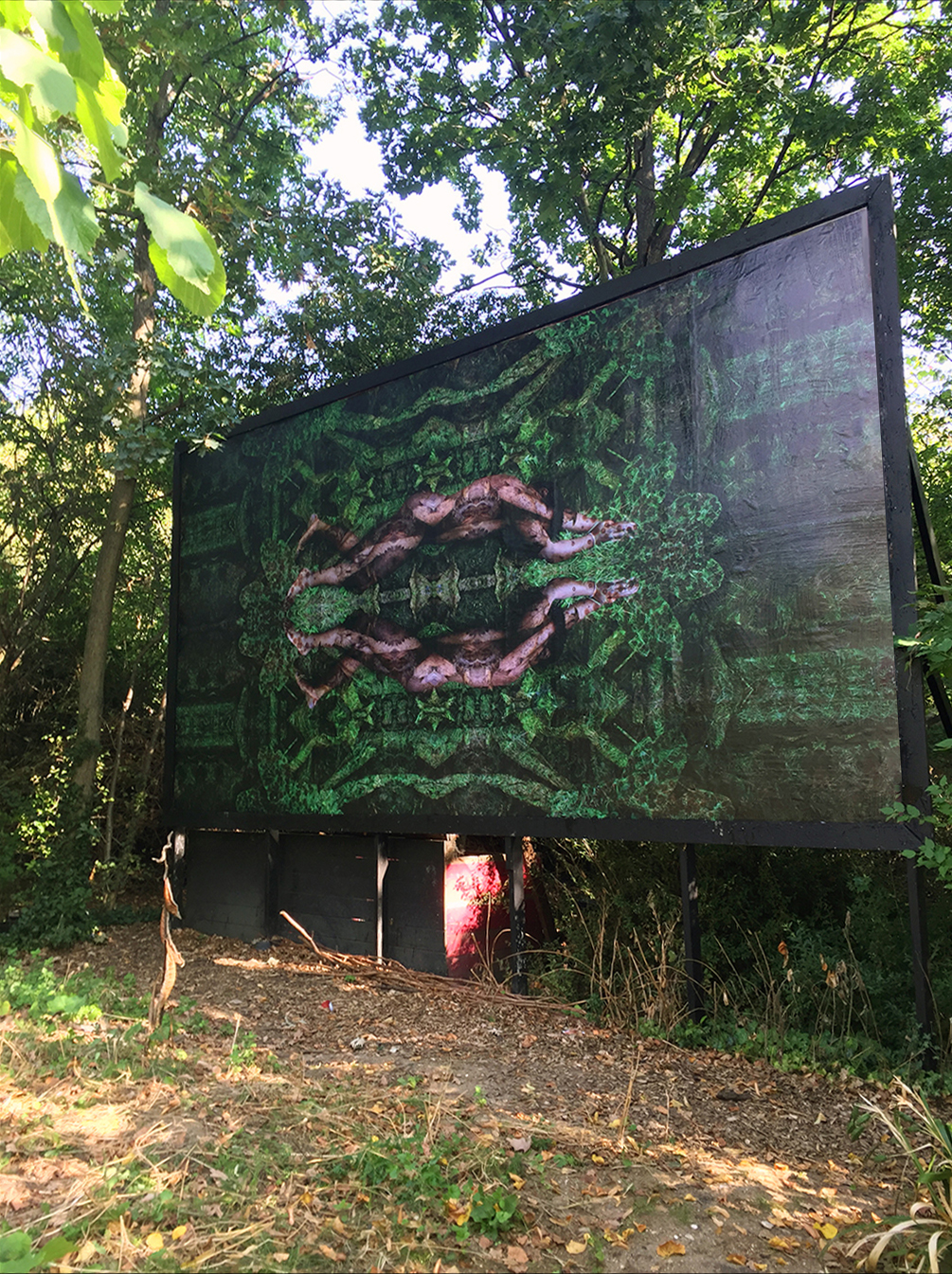
Billboard launching 'AUM' by Chakravarthi

In 2003 Chakravarthi was involved in the Live Art Development Agency's "Live Culture" event at Tate Modern, contributing to Guillermo Gómez-Peña's collaboration.

On 22 October 2024 at the Queer Heritage and Collections Network Symposium 2024, held at Kensington Palace, the keynote event was "In conversation with George Chakravarthi - discussion facilitated by Richard Sandell".

== Publications ==
- A survey of Chakravarthi's work can be found in "Sexuality (Whitechapel: Documents of Contemporary Art)" Edited by Amelia Jones, 2014.
- "What do relationships mean to you? - Emotional Learning Cards" - image of Barflies used to represent gender identity.
- "Performance Research - On Trans/Performance" - image of UNTITLED05, The Ambidextrous Universe used for cover.
- "Agency - a partial history of live art" - conversation between Chakravarthi and Manuel Vason, and image of Negrophilia.
- A still image from Chakravarthi's Olympia appears in "Rebels, radicals and revolutionaries: art and social change" by Marie-Anne Leonard
- "AUM" - signed limited edition folio box featuring artworks titled Brahma, Vishnu, Shiva ^{(bottom of the page)}

== Themes ==
A number of common themes are apparent in Chakravarthi’s work including:

- Self-portraiture: Many of Chakravarthi's works are various forms of self-portrait.
- Identity: Chakravarthi adopts numerous alter egos with different identities in his work; for example, he is male in some of the pieces within ‘Thirteen’, female for one of the characters in ‘Memorabilia/Aradhana’, transgender in ‘Barflies’, gay in ‘I Feel Love!’ and Indian in ‘Andhaka’.
- Race/multi-culturalism/racism: Jesus in ‘Resurrection’ is Indian and his hair, scattered over the table, is black in contrast to the (apparently) red hair of the white Jesus in Da Vinci's The Last Supper, and the female disciples are all dressed in traditional Indian saris reflecting Chakravarthi's cultural heritage (see the image of this work above). In ‘Olympia’ the servant is white and the “mistress” is Indian (see the image of this work above). ‘Negrophilia’ takes on the dichotomy between the fascination of some white audiences with black performers, e.g. Josephine Baker in Paris, and racist imagery in Hollywood cinema of the same era, e.g. the number ′Hot Voodoo′ in Blonde Venus, 1932 (Chakravarthi appears on stage in a gorilla costume), and subtly refers to evolution (ape to homo sapiens, and the origin of homo sapiens in the African continent).
- Gender/sexism/feminism: The female character in ‘Memorabilia/Aradhana’ is cast as a person to be married off and produce children for her husband. The twelve apostles in ‘Resurrection’ are all female, possibly alluding to the women apostles referred to in non-canonical Christian texts and in the Bible in Romans 16:7 (female disciples of Jesus). ‘Miss UK’, ‘Masking’ and ‘Barflies’ in particular address feminist politics.
- Sexuality/transvestitism: Chakravarthi dresses as female characters in many of his pieces of work, these include; ‘Memorabilia/Aradhana’, ‘Shakti’, ‘Barflies’, ‘Negrophilia’, some of the pieces within ‘Thirteen’, ‘Miss UK’ and ‘Andhaka’. In others (‘Remotecontrol’ and ‘Olympia’) the characters are androgynous. ‘To the Man in my Dreams’ can be interpreted as a son coming out to his father, or the correspondence between a gay man in a role-play relationship with an older man, among other possibilities. Chakravarthi’s character in ‘I Feel Love!’ (in terms of dress, the music used and his placement on a plinth) is probably based on a go-go dancer in a gay club.
- Self image/idealisation of image: ‘Remotecontrol’, ‘I Feel Love!’, ‘Barflies’ and ‘Miss UK’ all concern themselves with striving to have the ‘right’ image whether in terms of body, dress or age.
- Religion: ‘Shakti’ and ‘Andhaka’ explicitly refer to the Indian goddess Kali, and the Last Supper from the Bible is the subject of ‘Resurrection’. The layering of the components within the images of ‘Thirteen’ gives them an appearance of stained glass, particularly when displayed backlit in light boxes (see the photograph above of some of these images backlit in an exhibition), this may be a more subtle religious reference.
- Iconic paintings: A number of iconic paintings are specifically and unmistakably referenced by some of Chakravarthi's pieces, with details of the sets as well as the main subjects; Da Vinci's Mona Lisa in ‘Shakti’ and also his The Last Supper in ‘Resurrection’, and Manet's Olympia in ‘Olympia’. The use of gold and jewels in Cleopatra (within ‘Thirteen’) is reminiscent of works by Klimt (e.g. Adele Bloch-Bauer, 1907). Numerous paintings by Titian (e.g. Equestrian Portrait of Charles V, 1548) make dramatic use of clouds as does Chakravarthi's Lady Macbeth (also within ‘Thirteen’) – see the second image at the beginning of the 'Career' section above for some of the images from ‘Thirteen’.

== Personal life ==
Chakravarthi is married and lives in London and Leicestershire. He and his husband have been together since January 1994, they were legally married at Chelsea Old Town Hall, King's Road, London in May 2006 (their civil partnership having later been converted into marriage).

== See also ==
- Chakraborty - meaning of the name Chakravarthi.
