= Lovebytes =

UK digital arts organisation

- Website: www.lovebytes.org.uk

Lovebytes is a digital arts organisation based in Sheffield, UK, established in 1994 and best known for the Lovebytes International Festival of Digital Art. Founded by Jon Harrison and Janet Jennings who are the directors of the organisation.

Lovebytes explores the cultural and creative potential of digital technology. The festival is a platform for innovative and experimental new work in the fields of digital art, music, film, interactive media and creative software. The programme includes specially commissioned multimedia performances and interactive installations in public spaces supported by film screenings, talks, workshops and educational projects. Lovebytes is a not-for-profit limited company supported by the Arts Council England.

== History ==
Lovebytes was founded by Jon Harrison and Janet Jennings who are the directors of the organisation. Lovebytes has held many festivals between the years 1994 and 2012. Works from this festival has been placed in different locations across Sheffield attracting a lot of media attention. In the late 1990s Lovebytes also did some collaborative festivals/ events, e.g. Lovebytes / Senti-ents at The Unit.1999. In May 2000 Lovebytes released its first publication DSP 1 Audio CD and CD ROM and after that went on to release two more, DSP 2 Volatile Media DVD publication and exhibition released March 2002. Including work by People Like, Alex Peverett, Butler Brothers, Steve Hawley. DSP 3 CD ROM publication and exhibition released in March 2003. Featuring. Nullpointer, Lia.mc, Kurt Ralske, Dextro. Lovebytes had over 75,000 visitors in 2010 and runs various educational projects introducing young people to creative technology and computer programming through a range of playful and imaginative arts activities throughout the world. They also work with schools, colleges, universities, clubs, art galleries, libraries, community centers and interact with interested people in public spaces.

== Festivals and events ==
Multimedia Revue. (1994), a Lovebytes event featuring (Burn:Cycle / Virtual Nightclub). Venues: Showroom Workstation, Sheffield

Lovebytes.(1995) Featuring James Wallbank Venues: Workstation (Sheffield) & United Gallery, Sheffield.

Lovebytes Digital Art and Multimedia Festival. (1996) Featuring Sera Furneaux, Venues: Showroom Cinema, Workstation and Site Gallery.

Lovebytes Festival. (1998) Featuring Farmers Manual, Pita (Peter Rehberg). Venues: Showroom Cinema, Workstation and various around Sheffield City Centre.

Digital Originals (2000) Lovebytes festival Showroom Cinema, Sheffield (6–8 April).

Lovebytes International Festival of Digital Art. (2001) Featuring Florian Hecker Richard Chartier. Venues: Showroom Cinema & National Centre for Popular Music, Sheffield.

Lovebytes International Festival of Digital Art. (2002) Featuring: Scanner (Robin Rimbaud), Yasunao Tone. Venues: Showroom Cinema, Millennium Galleries, Persistence Works, Sheffield Independent Film.

Lovebytes International Festival of Digital Art. (2003) Featuring: Carsten Nicolai (Alva Noto), Chris Watson, Nobukazu Takemura, General Magic. Venues: Showroom Cinema, Exhibitions at Site Gallery 15 February – 22 March.

Lovebytes International Festival of Digital Art. (2005) Featuring: Peter Greenaway, Francisco López (musician) Venues: Showroom Cinema, Workstation Studio, Millennium Galleries, Sheffield Independent Film & Site Gallery (14 April – 18 June).

Environments International Festival of Digital Art and Media, Lovebytes. (2006) Featuring Francis Dhomont (2006), Carl Michael von Hausswolff. Venues: Showroom Cinema, Millennium Galleries, Workstation, Site Gallery, University of Sheffield Union of Students.

Lovebytes. Process (2007) Featuring Biosphere (musician) aka (Geir Jenssen) Yasunao Tone, Owl Project Venues: Sheffield Winter Gardens, Sheffield Central Library, Showroom Cinema, Site Gallery, University of Sheffield Union of Students, Millennium Galleries, The Moorlands Centre (Edale).

Lovebytes. Digital Art in Sheffield. (2008) Featuring and, Stephen Mathieu, Advanced Beauty, Universal Everything. Venues: Showroom Cinema, Millennium Galleries, Sylvester Space, Access Space Sheffield.

A Festival of Digital Creativity and Culture. January–June. (2010) Featuring: C.E.B. Reas, Golan Levin, Mehmet Akten, Francisco Lopez, Mark Fell Venues: Millennium Galleries, Winter Garden, Electric Works, Persistence Works.

Lovebytes- Digital Spring. (2012) Featuring: Alan Turing Centenary Exhibition, MegaDork, Onedotzero, Daniel Brown Jana Winderen, Venues: Showroom Cinema, Sheffield Central Library, Meadowhall Shopping Centre, Upper Chapel, Winter Garden.

== Other projects ==
Paradise Website Commission (1997) Paradise. is a web project initiated by the innovative UK arts ensemble Forced Entertainment. Commissioned by Lovebytes as part of the Channel Metropolis series, funded by the Arts Council England

Hypertribes (1998) Citywide new media public art installations. Showroom Cinema, Sheffield (16 March – 25 April)

- Event Details:
- Vanishing points of view by Mike Lawson Smith at Furnival Gate

- Stone Troupers by Steve Hawley & Jonathan Allen at Division Street

- Hyperphilately by Simon Poulter at Sheffield Post Office, Fitzalan Square

- Provincially/Provisionally by Andrew Stones at Sheffield's New Town Hall

- Flocked by Lulu Quinn at the House of Fraser in Sheffield High Street

- Remote Systems Premium Leisure at Ponds Forge Sports Centre in Commercial Street

Lovebytes Lite (2003) Live performances by Mark Fell and Jez Potter (SND, Shirt Trax). at Sheffield Millennium Galleries.

Lovebytes (2005–2009) A plasma screen installation at Sheffield Millennium Galleries, in collaboration with Sheffield Galleries and Museums Trust.

Digital Space (2006–2008) Showroom Cinema. A programme of events and exhibitions in collaboration with Showroom Workstation. Including work by: Vicki Bennett (People Like Us), Blast Theory, Steve Hawley, Derek Lodge, Terry Smith, Single Shot, Simon Warner, Caroline Locke, Andrew Kotting, Janek Schaefer, Nullpointer.

The Big Byte (2009) The Big Byte was a year-long programme of events supported by Arts Council England and Screen Yorkshire and delivered in partnership by various community organisations in Sheffield including: Sheffield Children's Festival, Sheffield Young Singers and Showcomotion Film Festival.

Designosaurs! (2011) A digital art project combining craft, computers and the creative imaginations of over 1,500 Sheffield school children, culminating in an interactive exhibition at the Sheffield Children's Festival.

== Publications ==
DSP 1 Audio CD and CD ROM released in May 2000. Part of the Digital Space Programme, a commissioning scheme for exhibition digital publications.

DSP 2 Volatile Media DVD publication and exhibition released March 2002. Including work by People Like us, Alex Peverett, Steve Hawley.

DSP 3 CD ROM publication and exhibition released in March 2003. Featuring. Nullpointer.
