= Julia Bardsley =

British artist

Julia Bardsley is an artist working with performance, video, photography, sculptural objects and the configuration of the audience. Her work challenges definitions of theatre and has been described as 'a major force in British experimental theatre and live art'.

== Education and career ==
Bardsley's stage performances in the 1980s included Marie-Christine in Ardèle, Where the Rainbow Ends, Gaudette at the Almeida Theatre (where she won the Time Out award for direction), and Too Clever by Half and A Flea in Her Ear (Antoinette Plucheux) at the Old Vic. She was also the assistant producer for A Night at the Chinese Opera with Kent Opera.

She began her career in theatre directing, writing and adapting works for the stage, and was joint artistic director of the Leicester Haymarket & Young Vic Theatres (1991–94). She was awarded an Honorary Doctorate from Middlesex University in 2007. Bardsley lectures at Queen Mary, University of London, and Central Saint Martins, University of the Arts London. Her work has become known for its experimental use of character, solo performance, and elaborate video and set work in a performance art/visual art context.

Bardsley's work is significant in its disruption of traditional understandings of theatre; her hybrid practice first developed in collaboration with designer Aldona Cunningham in the 1990s through their innovative work on Hamlet at the Young Vic, which in turn led to a five-year long creation process combining theatre, performance and photography, resulting in the work 12/Stages/3 (a Memory Theatre) as part of the British Festival of Visual Theatre in 1999.

From the late 1990s onwards her film and video works have been selected for film festivals internationally, collected and represented in collections such as Lux Artists Films and the University of the Arts British Artists' Film and Video Study Collection. She has also created video art work for theatre productions including An Ocean of Rain, at the Almeida Theatre, London, 2008, and Suenos composed by Simon Holt, premiered at Queen Elizabeth Hall, London in 2007.

== Selected works ==
=== The Divine Trilogy (2003–2009) ===
Presented in London, Glasgow, Portugal, Spain, Slovenia, Croatia, Belgium, and Italy. The three parts of which are:

- Trans Acts used religious imagery, combining video, installation and performance, premiered at The National Review of Live Art (2006), and went on to show at Shunt, London (2007)
- Almost the Same (feral rehearsals for violent acts of culture) a performance in three sections titled Nigredo, Rubedo and Albedo
- Aftermaths: A Tear in the Meat of Vision (2009) Commissioned by the SPILL International Festival of Performance uses the character of a cowboy evangelist to evoke apocalyptic and catastrophic visions of a world in chaos.

=== Improvements on Nature: a Double Act (2009) ===
Produced for Chelsea Theatre, Sacred Festival, Improvements on Nature: a Double Act explored themes of science using imagery of amputations. 'It's the science of Charles Darwin incubated by the traumatised imagination of Mary Shelley.'

=== meta_Family (2010–11) ===
A modular ensemble piece, the meta_Family, presented in Teresina & Rio, Brazil & Outside AiR - QMUL, London. In 2012 editions of the project were presented at Trouble#8 Festival, Brussels & City of Women Festival, Ljubljana.

=== Medea: dark matter events (2012–) ===
A performance project inspired by the Medea myth; drawing on themes of sexuality, eroticism and electricity.
