= Robin Deacon =

British artist, writer and filmmaker (born 1973)

Robin Deacon (born 1973 in Eastbourne, England) is an artist, writer and filmmaker. His interdisciplinary practice has spanned a variety of disciplines and themes, including explorations of performer presence and absence, the role of the artist as biographer, the possibility for journalistic approaches to arts practice, and the mapping and ethics of performance re-enactment. He graduated from Cardiff School of Art in 1996, and went on to present his performances and videos at conferences and festivals in the UK and internationally in Europe, USA and Asia. His work has been commissioned and programmed by venues such as The ICA, London (1996), The Young Vic, London (2000), CCCB, Barcelona (2006), Tanzquartier Wien, Vienna (2007) and the Centre d'art Scenique Contemporain Lausanne, Switzerland (2009), Tate Britain, London (2014) and the Barbican Centre, London (2015). He has also been artist in residence at MacDowell (artists' residency and workshop), New Hampshire, USA (2017) Sophiensaele, Berlin (2005), Camden Arts Centre London (2006) and Robert Wilson's Watermill Center, New York, USA (2009). He has received a variety of awards and fellowships from organizations such as the Foundation for Contemporary Arts, Delfina Foundation, British Arts Council, Live Art Development Agency and Franklin Furnace Inc. Between 2003 and 2012, he was an Associate Artist of contemporary artists producing organization Artsadmin. From 2004, he was Course Director of the Drama and Performance Studies program at London South Bank University before relocating to the USA in 2011. After ten years spent as Professor and Chair of Performance at the School of the Art Institute of Chicago, Robin returned to the UK in 2021 to take up the role of Artistic Director and CEO of the Spill Festival of Performance.

== Lectures and performances ==
Deacon’s early 1990s output focused on the visual and the physical, with a series of performances exploring object manipulation and personification. Later work began questioning the spatial limitations and social conventions imposed on performance with a series of interventions in public and televisual spaces, including an impromptu interrogation of former UK Home Secretary Michael Howard on the Channel 5 show, The Wright Stuff. The late 1990s saw a series of performances that explored issues of racial politics, and notions and definitions of obscenity produced in collaboration with performance artist and film actor Laurence R. Harvey. From the early 2000s, he began producing a series of works that used spoken word and lecture based presentation, such as Harry and Me (2004). This performance lecture described Deacon’s search for television footage of himself as a member of his school choir on an edition of Harry Secombe’s religious program Highway. The performance interrogates media representations of multiculturalism, pursuing the narrative that he was planted in the choir to provide a more racially integrated image. Deacon also become known for his works in political biography, with a series of performances on the lives of former US Secretary of State Colin Powell (2004–08) and German Chancellor Angela Merkel (2005). Both these performances were characterized by a humorous and often satirical approach to the subject matter. These works also had a strong multimedia element and were often rewritten in response to prevailing news events regarding their subjects. Deacon's later performance piece Prototypes (2006–09) stylistically referenced the output of documentary films produced by the British Transport Commission. Between 2011 and 2013, two new lecture based performances (The Argument Against the Body and White Balance: A History of Video) were presented in their early form. Following a development award from Franklin Furnace Inc. and a three day in progress presentation of the work at the Emily Harvey Gallery, NYC, a final version of White Balance was presented as part of the Conversations at the Edge series at the Gene Siskel Theater in Chicago (2015), and at the Spill Festival at the Barbican Centre, London (2015).

== Film and video ==
Although the use of video and film has often been incorporated as an element of Deacon’s live work, several of his projects explored these mediums in their own right. His early video pieces were short, single channel video works such as What is a Performance Artist? (2005), a compilation of uses of the word ‘performance art’ or ‘performance artist’ in popular cultural contexts such as cinema and television. In 2005, he received a Live Art Development Agency commission for the film They Used to Call it a White Elephant which was screened as part of the Variety season at the De La Warr Pavilion, Bexhill, UK. In 2009, he began initial work on what would become his first feature-length documentary film on the life of the late US American performance artist and filmmaker Stuart Sherman. The completed film, Spectacle: A Portrait of Stuart Sherman saw its first screening in 2013 in a curatorial collaboration between Performa and the 'Rituals of Rented Island' Exhibition at the Whitney Museum, New York. There were subsequent screenings at the BBC Art Screen Festival at the Glasgow Film Theatre (2014), Tate Britain in London (2014), and the Museum of Contemporary Art, Chicago (2015). Parallel to this film Robin Deacon performed and directed a series of live solo and group re-enactments of Sherman's performances, including Sherman's ensemble version of Hamlet (A portrait), which was shown as part of the Sacred: US Radical season at London's Chelsea Theatre in 2009.

== Writing and education ==
Robin Deacon has published several chapters based on his research and practice, including contributions to monographs on British Artist Joshua Sofaer (published by Intellect Live), Norwegian Performance group Baktruppen (published by Kontur) and on artist filmmaker Stuart Sherman (published by NYU Press). He has been invited to present at the Performance Studies International Conference at the University of Mainz, Germany (2001), University of Zagreb, Croatia (2009) and Stanford University, USA (2013). As well as his full time teaching positions at London South Bank University and the School of the Art Institute of Chicago, Robin Deacon has been a visiting artist and speaker at varied education institutions such as the Ruskin School of Art (Oxford, UK), St. Cloud State University (Minnesota, USA), Grand Valley State University (Michigan, USA), Roosevelt University (Chicago, USA), Penny W. Stamps School of Art & Design (Michigan, USA), Royal Holloway University (London, UK), Central St Martins (London, UK), Brunel University (London, UK), University of Roehampton (London, UK), Nottingham Trent University (UK), and Turku Art Academy (Finland).

== Live works ==
- Screen Memories (2021 - 2023)
- Vinyl Equations (2018 - 2019)
- White Balance: A History of Video (2013 - 2015)
- The Argument Against the Body (2011)
- Approximating the Art of Stuart Sherman (2009)
- Prototypes (2006 - 2009)
- Dispatches (2005)
- Whatever Happened to Colin Powell? (2004 - 2008)
- Harry and Me (2004 - 2005)
- Double O (2001)
- The Costello Show (with Laurence R. Harvey) (2000)
- Confessions of an Idiot (2000)
- Hard Water and Other Objects (1999)
- Employee of the Month (1998)

== Filmography ==
- Europe, Endless (12 mins, 2019)
- Spectacle: A Portrait of Stuart Sherman (92 mins, 2014)
- Words in my Mouth (4 min, 2007)
- They Used to Call it a White Elephant (35 min, 2006)
- What is a Performance Artist? (3 min, 2005)
- Passionate About (5 min, 2000)
