= Rajni Shah =

Rajni Shah is a British performance artist, writer and producer. Their work ranges from interactive works that involve the public to large-scale performances. They have performed in the UK, Europe and USA, including the National Review of Live Art, Alternate ROOTS, Tanzquartier Wien, Arnolfini Bristol, Nuffield Lancaster, SpielArt Munich and the Chelsea Theatre.

== Works ==
- Small Gifts: (2006-2010) - they conducted a three-year inquiry into the relationship between gift and conversation in public spaces called small gifts.
- Mr Quiver (2005-2008)
- Dinner with America (2007-2009)
- Glorious (2009-2012) - Trilogy of large-scale performances: addressing the complexities of cultural identity in the 21st century.

=== Small Gifts ===
Rajni Shah and two of the following: Lucille Acevedo-Jones, Lucy Cash, Sheila Ghelani and Ilana Mitchell.

Small Gifts explored the effect of gift-giving in a public space - namely a shopping centre. In particular, there was a discussion around concepts of radical generosity to people. Some of the questions that this series addressed include:

• What would our world look like if we exchanged gifts rather than money? • What is the value in speaking to strangers? • What if we focused on giving as much as we can rather than as little?

Interventions such as “give what you can, take what you need,” where passersby were invited to share resources to enable the idea that 'everyone may have something useful to give'

A large dining table was laid out with one hundred tiny envelopes, each containing a one-pound coin (US$1.50). Passersby were asked to take part by acceptance of the envelope. On doing so they became part of the conversation, and then had to decide for themselves whether or how they will spend the pound, and whether they will return to the table. If they do return with something to offer, they are invited to use their conversation-starter question to meet new people, and can partake of whatever is on the table at that time.

=== Mr. Quiver ===
Rajni Shah (director/performer), Lucille Acevedo-Jones (costume/set designer) and Cis Oboyle (lighting designer).

Three performative loops that weave in and out of synchronisation. Through repeatedly inhabiting and abandoning the figures of Elizabeth I and a traditional Indian bride, Rajni reveals more and more of their true self during the performance and gently invites the audience to question their own identity.

This piece questioned representation, ethnicity and what it means to be British.

'It's a beautiful piece, a living work of art.' said Total Theatre magazine

‘Mr Quiver is gloriously exciting. As the performance unfolds it conjures rich atmospheres and its durational nature leaves space for the political content to breathe and for audiences to make their own connections and associations.’ Richard Kingdom (Demonstrate), selecting artist, commented.

=== Dinner With America ===
Performed and written by Rajni Shah. Costume designer Lucille Acevedo-Jones and film and video artist Lucy Cash, with original lighting design by Cis O’Boyle and technical operation by Steve Wald, a dinner to remember.

Part of the SPILL festival 2009.

“I’m fascinated by the notion that in this day and age everyone carries a small piece of ‘America’ inside them, a tiny concept or visual reference, often involuntary. And I’m at once repulsed and delighted at just how easily I feel connected with those ideas, which are often linked to capitalist ideals, of freedom, saturation, desire, individuality. So this is a piece about the ideas and images that we call ‘American’ and, for me, about a complicated personal attachment to both the land and ideas of the United States.” – Rajni Shah

- Colchester Arts Centre (2009)
- Wunderbar festival, Newcastle (2009)
- Laban Centre, London (2009)
- Phoenix, Exeter (2009)
- SPILL festival, London (2009)
- Laboral Cultural Centre, Gijon, Spain - part of the S.P.A.C.E. British Council showcase (2009)
- Nuffield Theatre, Lancaster (2008)

Previews and in-progress performances:

- The Bluecoat, Liverpool (2008)
- Pinter Studio, Queen Mary, University of London (2008)
- The Basement, Brighton (2008)
- The Showroom, University of Chichester (2007)
- Pine Gallery, Coastal Currents, Hastings (2007)

Articles about Dinner with America were published Total Theatre and Dance Theatre Journal and in Spring 2009 at Spill Overspill, in Real Time magazine, and at Poptronics (French).
