= People Like Us (musician) =

Vicki Bennett
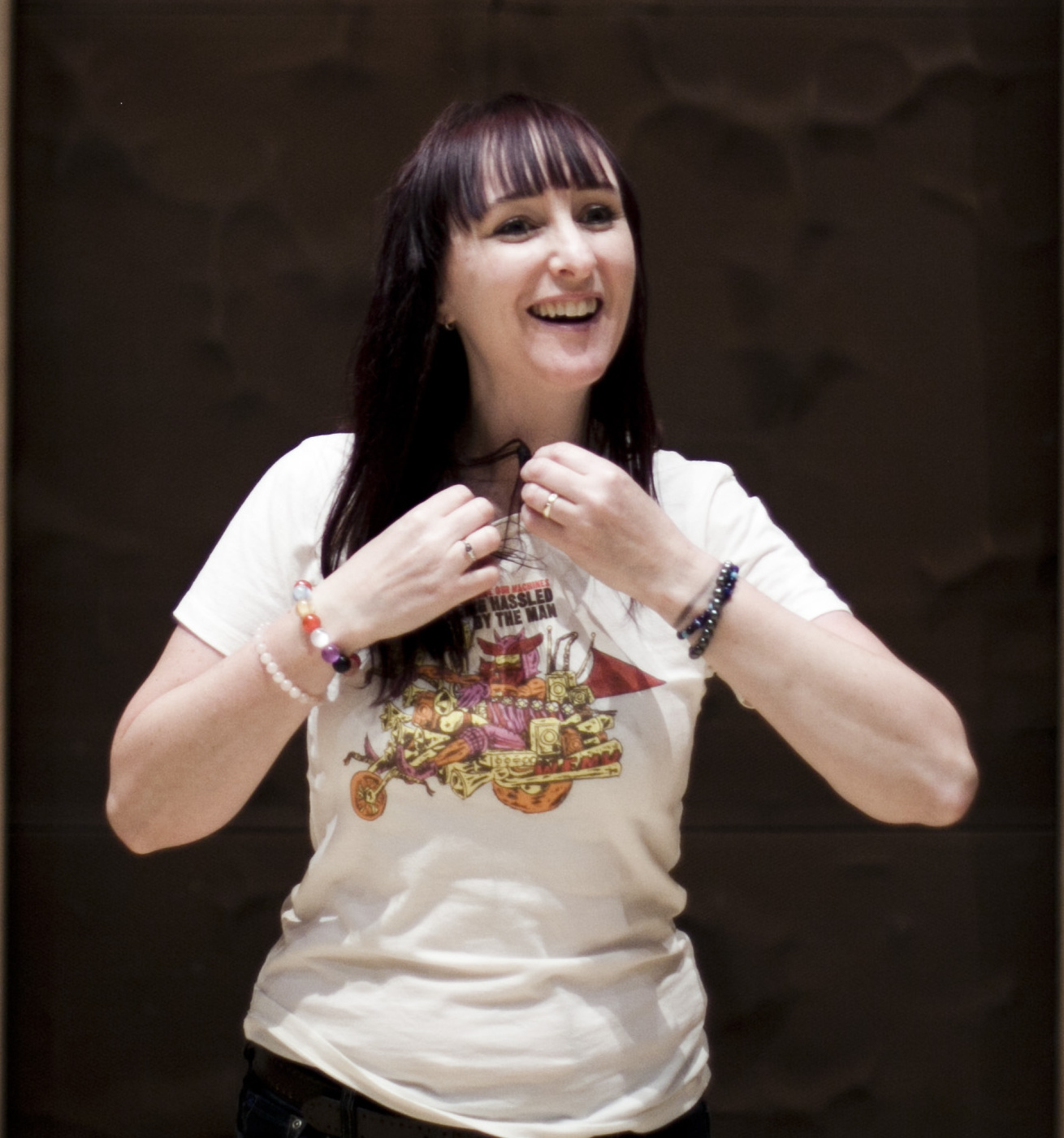
- Vicki Bennett in 2012

Background information
- Also known as: People Like Us
- Born: 1967 (age 58–59)
- Origin: London
- Genres: Sound collage
- Years active: 1991–present
- Website: peoplelikeus.org

People Like Us is the stage name of London DJ multimedia artist Vicki Bennett. She has released a number of albums featuring collages of music and sound since 1992. In recent years, she has performed at a number of modern art galleries, festivals and universities.

== Musical career ==
Since 1991 Vicki Bennett has been making CDs, radio, and A/V multimedia under the name People Like Us. By using animation and collage techniques with existing footage, Vicki presents a perspective on popular culture characterized by humor and dark themes with surrealist elements.

Vicki has shown work at, amongst others, Tate Modern, The National Film Theatre, Purcell Room, The ICA, Sydney Opera House, Pompidou Centre, Sonar in Barcelona, The Walker Art Center in Minneapolis, the BBC and Channel 4. She has also performed radio sessions for the BBC's John Peel, Mixing It, and also the CBC, KPFA and many more in the US. There have been features in The Observer, The Wire, NME, BBC website and Bizarre Magazine. People Like Us have been commissioned by The Arts Council England, The BBC, Sonic Arts Network, Forma, LUX and Lovebytes amongst others.

== Recordings ==
PLU has been released on labels such as Tigerbeat6, Soleilmoon, Sonic Arts Network, Touch, Staalplaat and For Us Records (Rough Trade), both solo, and also collaborating with Matmos, Ergo Phizmiz, Wobbly, members of Negativland and Christian Marclay.

Spring 2008 saw a Retrospective of People Like Us at alt.gallery and a PLU curated CD entitled Smiling Through My Teeth, with Sonic Arts Network. The June 2008 edition of The Wire featured a 4-page interview, and the July edition featured a review of Smiling Through My Teeth.

In June 2010, she released the album Music for the Fire with Wobbly on the Illegal Art label.

== Performance and multimedia work ==
Vicki completed the Great North Run Moving Image Commission 2009, and a live A/V set premiered in October 2009 at Vancouver New Music Festival. The UK premiere was performed at BFI Southbank in December 2009.

Vicki worked on a commission for Edinburgh Printmakers as part of the exhibition "Prints of Darkness", coinciding with Edinburgh Art Festival in July 2010. People Like Us recently curated "Nothing Is New, Everything Is Permitted" at AV Festival, and will soon perform concerts of "Genre Collage" at MACBA, Liverpool Sound City, Bristol Arnolfini, Copenhagen and Jerusalem.

In January 2015 her audiovisual performance Citation City premiered at transmediale, Berlin at Haus der Kulturen der Welt. Inspired by The Arcades Project by Walter Benjamin, this audiovisual work is created from thousands of clippings of text and visual media, collaged using a system of “convolutes”, collated around subjects of key motifs, historical figures, social types, cultural objects from the time.

== DO or DIY ==
People Like Us has programmed "DO or DIY", an experimental arts radio and podcast show, on WFMU since 2003. The show appears weekly on a seasonal basis. WFMU has also created a 24-hour-per-day radio stream of sound collage and music chosen by Bennett.

== Projects ==
- Lovebytes commission in association with Millennium Galleries, Sheffield to make three screen A/V film "Work, Rest & Play" (June 2007)
- Artist Residency at BBC Creative Archive with "access all areas" to work with their archive – Arts Council England (Interdisciplinary Arts) with BBC, White City – (March 2006)
- Curation of CD "Smiling Through My Teeth" – Sonic Arts Network (May 2008)
- Edinburgh Printmakers commission to create audio and artwork for a picture disc LP “This Is Light Music”, as part of their group exhibition “Prints of Darkness” shown at Edinburgh Printmakers in summer 2010 (2009–2010)
- Forma/AV Festival commission “Now Hear This” to make Bluetooth audio compositions for mobile phone (January 2008)
- Future Physical commission to make digital short film "The Remote Controller" (June 2002)
- Grants For The Arts commission to create 10" record to be given away for free in selected international record stores "Honeysuckle Boulevard" (August 2006)
- Grants for the Arts commission to create new live A/V performance – (April 2005)
- Grants For The Arts commission to make a new live A/V set entitled “Genre Collage” (2008–2009)
- Grants For The Arts commission to make podcast series "Codpaste" on WFMU, where People Like Us and Ergo Phizmiz explore the working process of creating music from scratch (September 2007)
- Grants For The Arts commission to release of "Rhapsody In Glue" with Ergo Phizmiz on bleep.com – an album created with audio collage sourced from the podcast “Codpaste” (May 2008)
- Great North Run Moving Image Commission 2009 – The Great North Run Cultural Programme – to create a film using the archives of the Great North Run, entitled “Parade” (July 2008 – October 2009)
- Lecturing "Music & Other Media"- Goldsmiths, London (2006–2008)
- Live session and radio broadcast for “Mixing It”, Dingwalls (March 2001) and in Spitz (May 2004)
- Lovebytes commission to make short film "We Edit Life" (December 2002)
- LUX commission to make digital short film sourcing the LUX archive collection "Resemblage" (October 2004)
- PRS Foundation award to create a new live set (with artist Ergo Phizmiz) using dansette players and self-pressed vinyl compositions "Boots!" (June 2006)
- Radio session for BBC Radio 3’s “Mixing It” (February 2007)
- Radio session for John Peel (January 2003)
- Residency at FACT to make radio play “Molaradio” in collaboration with artist Felix Kubin and Croxteth schoolchildren (January 2004)
- Retrospective exhibition of People Like Us A/V work, entitled "We Edit Life" at alt.gallery (May 2008)
- Sonic Arts Network commission to make short film and subsequent DVD release – "Story Without End" – (June 2004)
- Wandsworth Film Awards commission to make short digital film "Skew Gardens", exploring the boundaries of urban land use – (September 2007)
- WFMU Radiovision Festival Saturday Symposium OCT 2011 Celebrating radio's future as it takes on new forms in the digital age for the medium's fans, tinkerers and future thinkers. A day of talks, panel discussions and performances.
- Work & Leisure International commission to make new A/V live set – (September 1999)
- Year of the Artist Residency, Hull Time Based Arts, making A/V collage – (January–April 2001)
- Year of the Artist Residency, Lighthouse, Brighton with Brighton & Hove Music Library, teaching sound collage (June 2001)

== Discography ==
This includes singles and collaboration records.

=== CD releases ===
- 1992: Another Kind of Humor Another Kind of Murder (split with Abraxas) World Serpent/GBCD1/GB1.
- 1994: Lowest Common Dominator Staalplaat/STCD079.
- 1994: Guide To Broadcasting Staalplaat/STMDCD2.
- 1996: Beware The Whim Reaper Staalplaat/STCD 101.
- 1997: Hate People Like You Staalplaat/STCD 119.
- 1999: People Like Us Meet The Jet Black Hair People In Concert Audioview 005.
- 1999: Hate People Like Us (remix of PLU by Coil, Negativland, Death in June, Barbed, Christoph Heemann, Bruce Gilbert, Stock, Hausen & Walkman, Rehberg & Bauer, Mika Vainio, Boyd Rice, Dummy Run, Farmer's Manual and Sons of Silence. 2CD features additionally Cyclobe, Req1, V/VM, Sniper, Mr Rotorvator, Felix Kubin, Xper, Xr, Venoz [TKS], Katy Brown and Dr P Li Khan. There was an additional remix by Andy Votel / Badly Drawn Boy, excluded for legal reasons. *Caciocavallo/CAD1 (CD) and Staalplaat/STCD126 (2CD)
- 2000: Thermos Explorer Hot Air/Airhead002.
- 2000: A Fistful of Knuckles Caciocavallo/CAD10.
- 2002: Recyclopaedia Britannica Mess Media/Mess 1.
- 2002: Preserved Cowgirl Asphodel – remix of Tipsy.
- 2003: Wide Open Spaces Tigerbeat6 label collaboration with Matmos and Wobbly.
- 2003: Nothing Special Mess03 (CD) collaboration with Kenny G
- 2004: Windpipe Moods – Mukow.
- 2006: All Together Now
- 2007: Perpetuum Mobile - collaboration with Ergo Phizmiz.
- 2010: Music for the Fire – Illegal Art label collaboration with Wobbly.
- 2011: Welcome Abroad – Illegal Art label.
- 2019: The Mirror Discrepant.

=== DAT releases ===
- 1994: It's Terrorific! Staalplaat.

=== LP releases ===
- 1996: Jumble Massive Soleilmoon Recordings/SOLV005.
- 1996: File Under Easy Listening/File Under Sleazy Listening (split with Sniper) Kleptones 1
- 1997: Blundersonix/Special Mix (split with TFU) Kleptones 2
- 1997: People Like Us and Sniper Play The Three DJs of The Apocalypse (with Sniper) Kleptones 4.
- 2019: The Mirror Discrepant.

=== 7" releases ===
- 2001: Swing Largo/Going Out of My Town Klang Galerie/GG30.
- 2002: Rough Trade label For Us Records.
- 2008: Withers in the Waking – collaboration with Ergo Phizmiz

=== 12" releases ===
- 2001: Home-Roam-Play/Work-All-Day (remix by Matmos)
- 2001: Wicked Witch Records recalled due to faulty pressing
- 2002: Stifled Love Mess Media/Mess 2

=== Other releases ===
- 1997: Lassie House Staalplaat/STPLUPOO1 (10" Picture Disc)
- 2003: Volatile Media Lovebytes label (DVD)
- 2008: Rhapsody in Glue collaboration with Ergo Phizmiz (Digital release)
