= Stuart Sherman (artist) =

American artist and writer

Stuart A. Sherman
- Born: November 9, 1945; Providence, Rhode Island
- Died: September 14, 2001 (aged 55); San Francisco, California
- Education: Antioch College

Stuart A. Sherman (9 November 1945 – 14 September 2001) was an American performance artist, playwright, filmmaker, videographer, poet, essayist, sculptor and collagist.

== Life and career ==
Sherman was born 9 November 1945 to Helen Gordon and Samuel Sherman in Providence, Rhode Island. Soon after attending Antioch College in Yellow Springs, Ohio, Sherman moved to Manhattan and began a career in the arts which would span the next three decades. Before mounting his own work, Stuart Sherman worked extensively with Charles Ludlam in the early days of the Ridiculous Theatrical Company and with Richard Foreman's Ontological-Hysteric Theater (Sherman appeared as Max in Foreman's "Pain(t)" in 1974).

Sherman was possibly best known for his solo "spectacles": programs of very short playlets performed on portable tabletops propped open on the sidewalk—or in the park, or someone’s apartment—in which he would physically manipulate and create semantic "dramas" around inanimate objects. He created and performed eighteen "spectacles" in all (12 solo and 6 group performances) as well as larger-scale dramatic works, including Chekhov, Brecht and Strindberg (1985–86), a trilogy of short plays adapting and commenting obliquely on those authors, Slant (concerning Emily Dickinson) (1987), and Solaris (1992).

Stuart Sherman also made over forty films and videos (rarely lasting more than five minutes), many of the most haunting of which were portraits of friends: Portrait of Benedicte Pesle (1984), Mr. Ashley Proposes (Portrait of George) (1985), Liberation (Portrait of Berenice Reynaud) (1993), and the 73-second Edwin Denby (1978). Nearly all of Stuart Sherman's film works are in the permanent collection of the Museum of Modern Art. Although best known for his performances and video, Sherman practiced in a variety of visual and literary mediums. He considered all of his artistic practices to share a performative dimension, and denied any guiding aesthetic principle. Sherman was wary of attributing any strict meaning to his work and assumed an essential polysemy in its interpretation. This assumption critically aligned Sherman's work with that of many of his downtown contemporaries.

Akin to the many distinct forms his art took, Sherman's work found an international audience. Although perhaps most at home with his New York contemporaries, he performed, exhibited, and lectured throughout the US (San Francisco, Cambridge, Boston, Indianapolis, Chicago) and abroad (Germany, the Netherlands, France, Wales, Japan, Australia).

Stuart Sherman received numerous awards for his work, including a Prix de Rome, a Guggenheim Fellowship, an Obie, a MacDowell Colony fellowship, an Asian Cultural Council grant, a DAAD grant for residency in Berlin, and grants from the National Endowment for the Arts.

Sherman died of AIDS in San Francisco on 14 September 2001.

In 2009 Sherman was honored with two exhibitions in New York. Beginningless Thought/ Endless Seeing: The Works of Stuart Sherman, curated by John Hagan, Yolanda Hawkins, and John Matturri and organized by Jonathan Berger. exhibited at 80WSE Gallery New York University October 21 - December 19, 2009. Stuart Sherman: Nothing Up My Sleeve, curated by Jonathan Berger, exhibited as part of Performa 09 at PARTICIPANT, INC. New York, Nov. 8-Dec. 20, 2009. Both exhibitions were reviewed in many publications including The New York Times, Frieze Magazine, Art in America In 2015, Sherman was the subject of a documentary film by British artist and writer Robin Deacon, Spectacle: A Portrait of Stuart Sherman

== Stage works ==
- First Spectacle (1975)
- Second Spectacle (with Stefan Brecht, Richard Foreman, Kate Manheim) (1976)
- Seventh Spectacle (with 30 performers) (1976)
- Tenth Spectacle (Portraits of Places) (1978)
- Eleventh Spectacle (The Erotic) (1979)
- Twelfth Spectacle (Language) (1980)
- Thirteenth Spectacle (Time) (1980)
- First Trilogy: Hamlet, Oedipus, Faust (1981–84)
- Second Trilogy: Chekhov, Strindberg, Brecht (1985–86)
- The Man in Room 2538 (1986)
- It Is Against the Law To Shout "Fire" In A Crowded Theater (1986)
- Endless Meadow and So Forth (1986)
- This House Is Mine Because I Live In It (1986)
- Slant (concerning Emily Dickinson) (1987)
- Crime and Punishment, or the Book and the Word (1987)
- "A" Is For Actor (1987)
- The Yellow Chair (1987)
- But What Is The Word For "Bicycle"? (1988)
- The Play of Tea, or Pinkies Up! (1989)
- Objects of Desire (1989)
- Knock, Knock, Knock, Knock (1989)
- Fourteenth Spectacle (1989)
- Taal Eulenspiegel (1990)
- Fifteenth Spectacle (1991)
- Sixteenth Spectacle (It's a Musical!) (La Mama E.T.C., March 18, 1991)
- Solaris (1992)
- Seventeenth Spectacle (Yes and Noh) (1993)
- Eighteenth Spectacle (The Spaghetti Works) (1993)
- Nineteenth Spectacle (But Second Musical) (La MaMa E.T.C., Jan. 10, 1994)
- Queer Spectacle (1994)
- The Stations of the Cross, or the passion of Stuart (2000)

== Filmography ==
- Globes (1977), 2:41
- Scotty and Stuart (1977), 2:22
- Skating (1978), 2:44
- Tree Film (1978), 1:30
- Edwin Denby (1978), 1:13
- Camera/Cage (1978), 2:57
- Flying (1979), 0:50
- Baseball/TV (1979), 1:12
- Hand/Water (1979), 1:37
- Piano/Music (1979), 1:17
- Roller Coaster/Reading (1979), 3:00
- Fountain/Car (1980), 0:39
- Rock/String (1980), 0:55
- Elevator/Dance (1980), 3:12
- Theatre Piece (1980), 0:52
- Bridge Film (1981), 1:20, d.o.p Patrice Kirchhofer
- Hors-Titre I (1981), 15:00, as an actor, directed by Patrice Kirchhofer
- Racing (1981), 1:05
- Typewriting (Pertaining to Stefan Brecht) (1982), 2:06
- Chess (1982), 1:20
- Golf Film (1982)
- Fish Story (1983), 0:52
- Portrait of Benedicte Pesle (1984), 0:56
- Mr. Ashley Proposes (Portrait of George) (1985), 1:35
- Eating (1986), 6:10
- The Discovery of the Phonograph (1986), 6 min
- Scotty Snyder (All Around the Table) (1987), 10:13
- Berlin Tour (1988), 12 min
- Black-Eyed Susan (Portrait of an Actress) (1989), 9 min
- Liberation (Portrait of Berenice Reynaud) (1993), 8 min

== Videography ==
- Five Flowers (1982)
- Berlin (West)/Andere Richtungen (1986)
- Gray Matter (1987)
- Video Walk (1987)
- Yes and Noh Karaoke (1993)
- Scaffolding (1993)
- Don't Hang Up, I'm Freezing (1994)
- A Glass of Fish (1994)
- Cheers! (1994)
- Two Pixel Videos (Black and White/Grain) (1994)
- The Leap (1994)
- Bill Rice's Beer Garden (1994)
- Son of Scotty and Stuart (1994)
- Me and Joe (1994)
- 8 Eggs (1994)
- Pull (A Portrait of David Nunemaker) (1994)
- News Break (1994)
- Holy Bible (1994)
- Ah-Choo (1994)

== Awards ==
- Prix de Rome
- Guggenheim Fellowship
- Obie
- MacDowell Colony fellowship
- Asian Cultural Council Grant
- DAAD Grant for residency in Berlin
- grants from the National Endowment for the Arts.
