= Tim Etchells =

English artist and writer

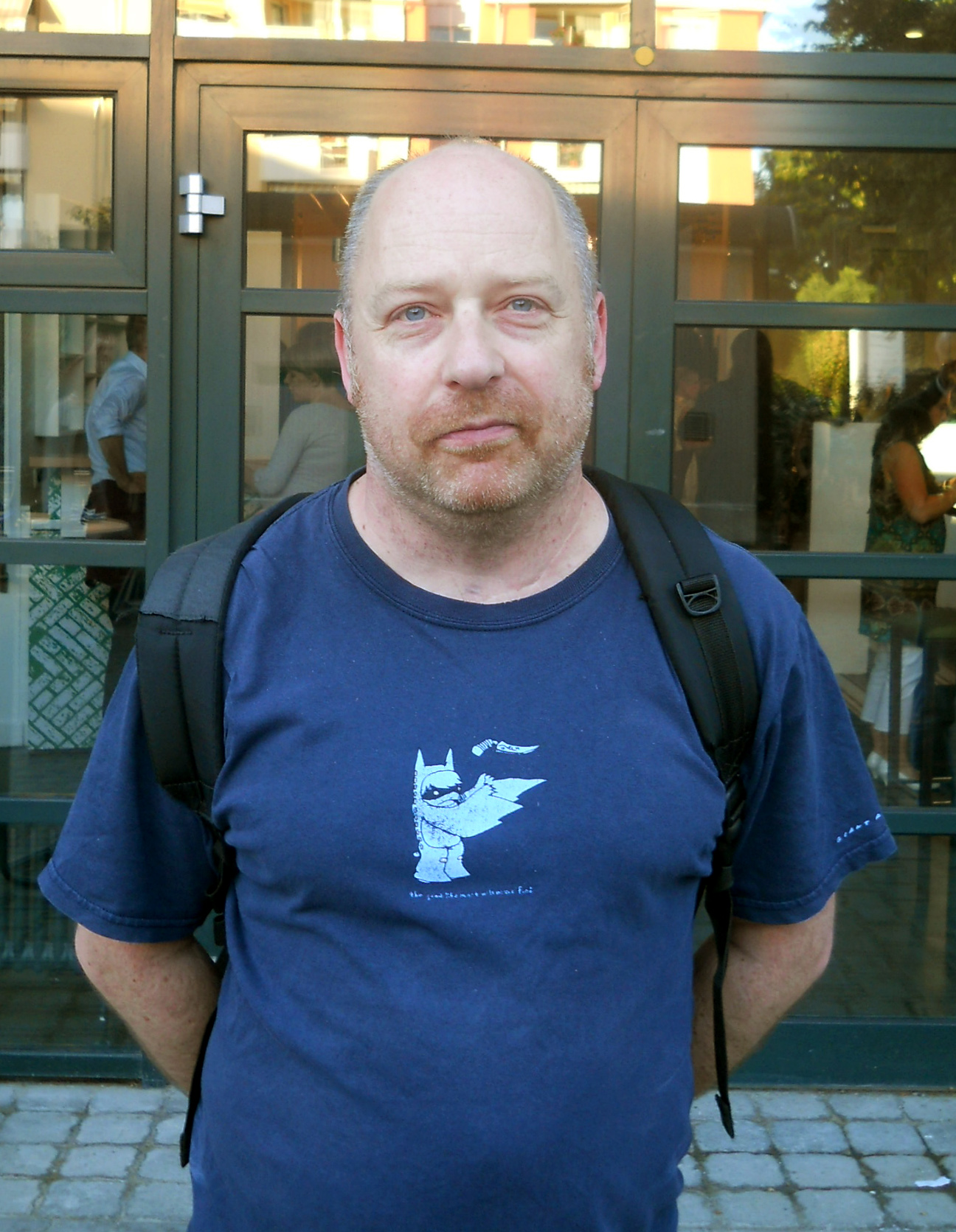
- Etchells in September 2012
- Born: 1962 (age 63–64); Stevenage, Hertfordshire, England
- Website: www.timetchells.com

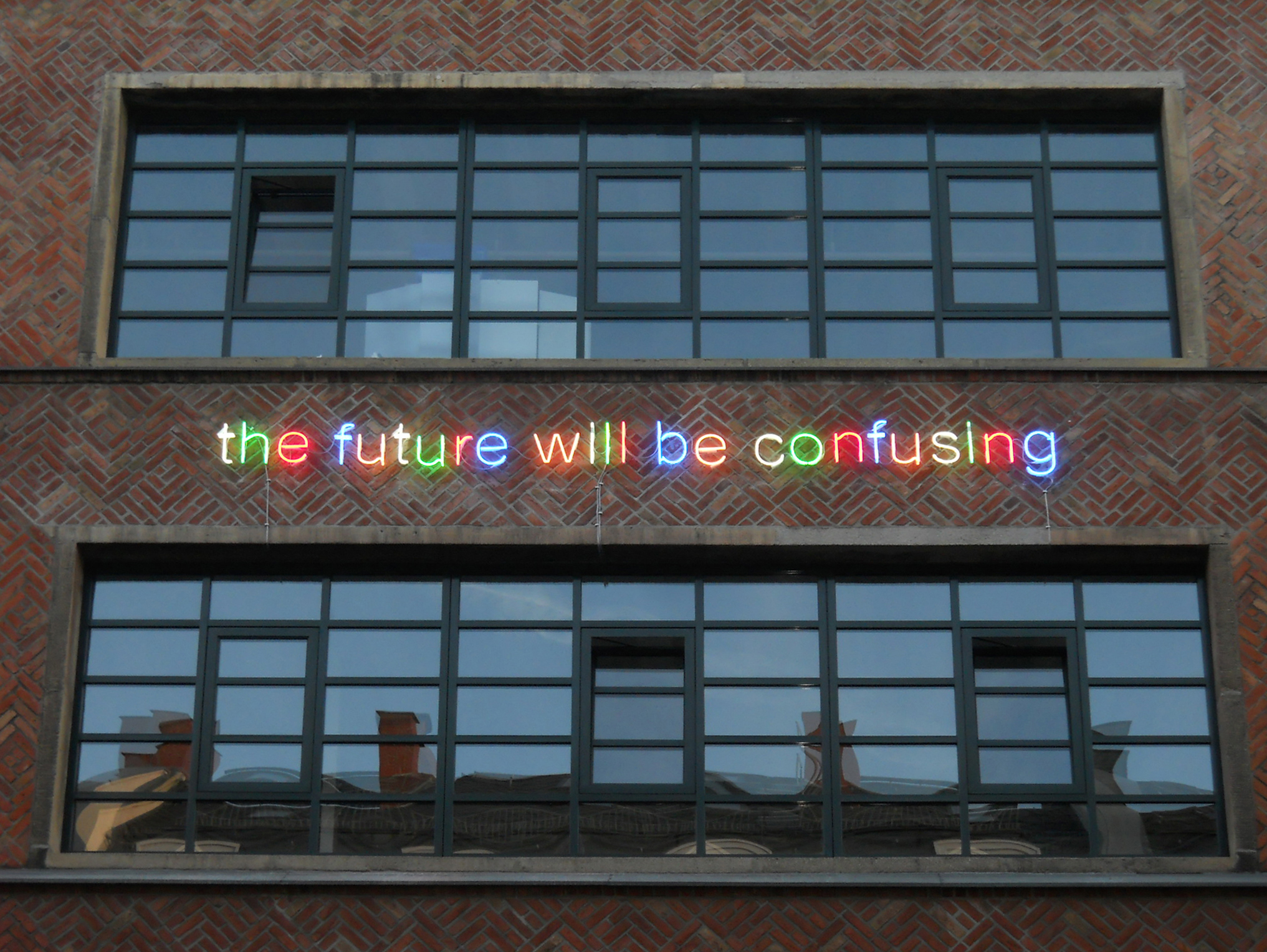
Etchells' the future will be confusing, Mousonturm, Frankfurt

Tim Etchells (born 1962) is an English artist and writer based in Sheffield and London. Etchells is the artistic director of Forced Entertainment, an experimental performance company founded in 1984. He has published several works of fiction, written about contemporary performance and exhibited his visual art projects in various locations. Etchells' work spans performance, video, photography, text projects, installation and fiction. He is currently Professor of Performance and Writing at Lancaster University.

== Biography ==
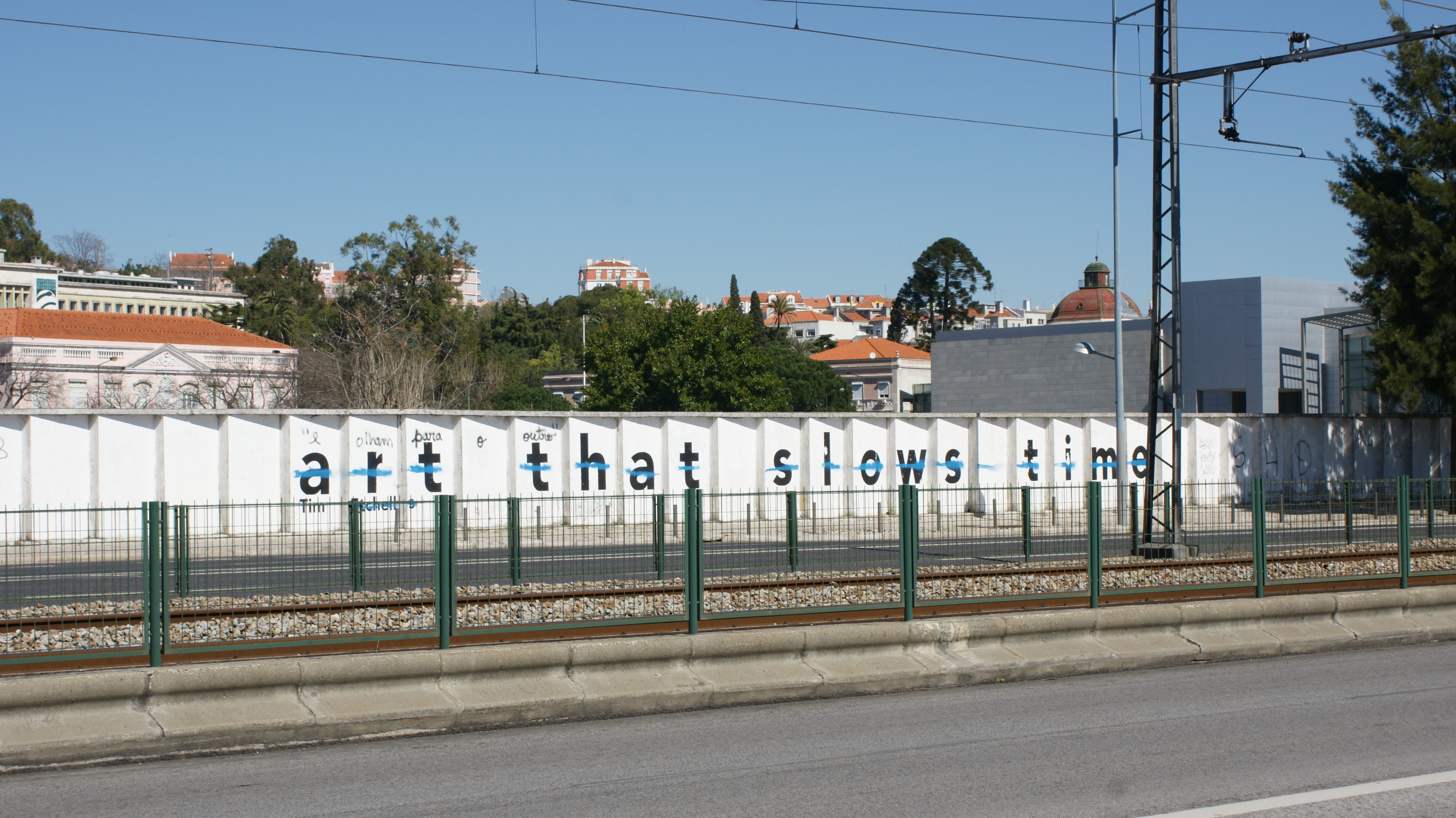
Art that slows time, in Lisbon

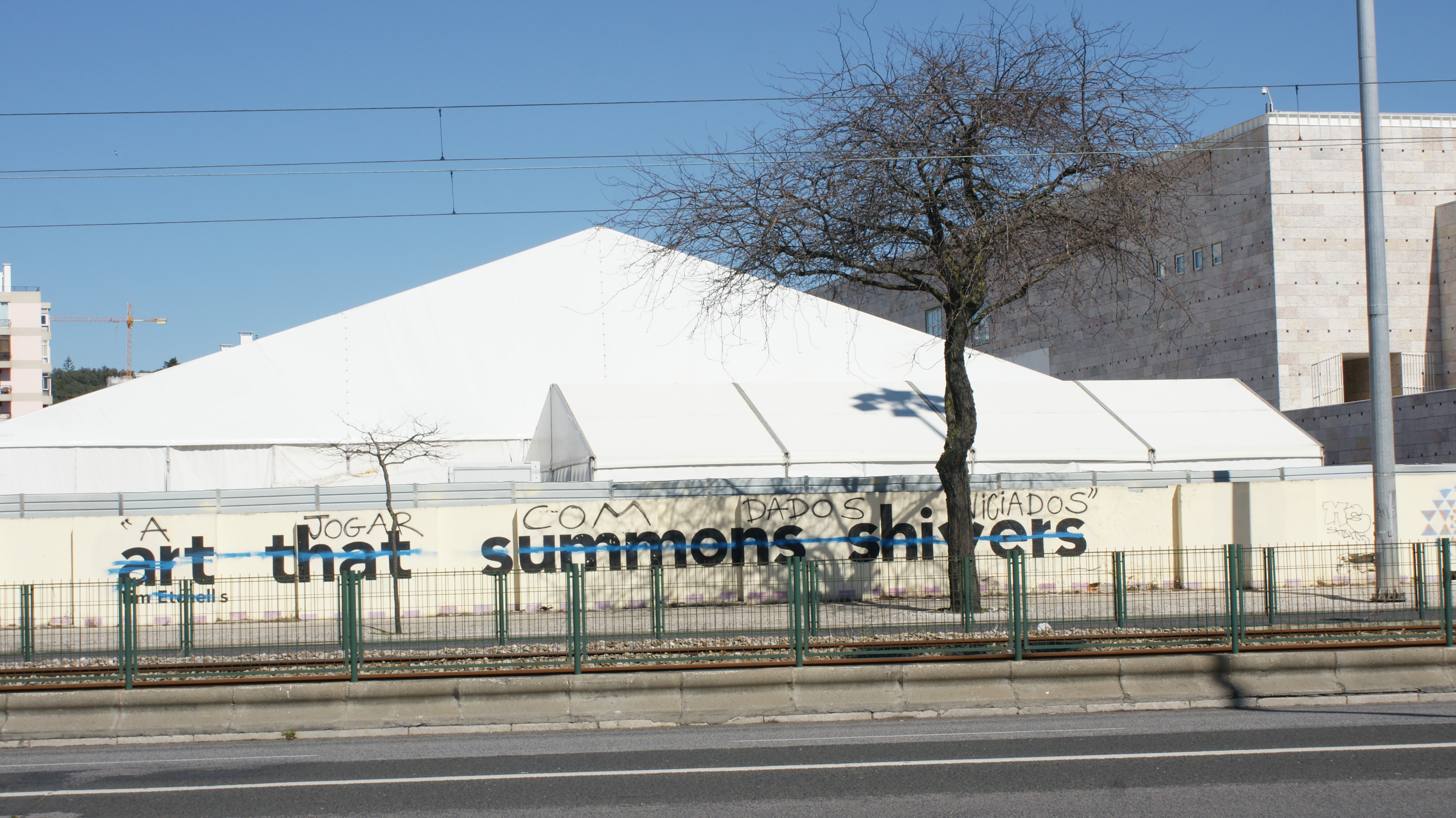
Art that summons shivers, Lisbon

Etchells is currently Professor of Performance at Lancaster University and has been teaching extensively in a variety of contexts. In 2006, he convened The Presence Project, a series of workshops at Stanford University.

Etchells' publication, Vacuum Days, based on his year-long web-based project of 2011, was published by Storythings in 2012. Etchells has published several works of fiction, Endland Stories, The Dream Dictionary for the Modern Dreamer and the novel The Broken World and has written about contemporary performance in The Guardian and in artist monographs, such as an MIT Press publication on the work of Tehching Hsieh and a Live Art Development Agency publication on Ron Athey.

In 2013 he was guest curator of Ljubljana's Exodos Festival – selecting an international programme of work in performance, theatre and dance. On 25 November 2013, Etchells gave a public keynote address Live Forever, at Tate Modern in the frame of their research series Collecting the Performative A new public sculpture work by Etchells, A Stitch in Time was commissioned for the Lumiere light festival in Derry, and installed on top of the old Rosemount Shirt Factory. The work comprises a 23 metre long and 2 metre high sign made with white LED bulbs.

In 2014 Etchells was invited to be part of Lisbon biennial Artist in the City program.

In 2019, And Other Stories published Endland, a collection of short stories by Etchells.

== Collaborations ==
Etchells regularly collaborates with artists, including photographer Hugo Glendinning, with whom he worked on the 1999 exhibition Void Spaces and the ongoing series Empty Stages. Empty Stages has been exhibited widely, including as part of Etchells' solo show at Jakopic Gallery in Ljubljana in 2013.

Other collaborations include writing essays for performance artist Franko B's Still Lives publication, for the visual art duo Elmgreen and Dragset's project Drama Queens and working with the pair on their later project Happy Days in the Art World. An Art in America article on Happy Days in the Art World said "Etchells is an experimental British playwright of some fame whose work is Beckettian, not Beckett-esque. His work is mocking and meandering but can really get under the skin, and prick at latent feelings of abjection, loneliness, the inability to communicate, futility."

Etchells collaborated with interactive performance maker Ant Hampton on two projects Lest We See (2013) and The Quiet Volume (2010) which has been produced in English, German, Spanish, Slovenian, Japanese, Polish, Dutch and Portuguese. The Quiet Volume won a 2013 Bessie Dance and Performance Award for Outstanding Sound Design following presentations by Performance Space 122 and PEN World Voices Festival. The citation for the award ran as follows: "For their use of intimately whispered text in a work in libraries across the city and for a score which heightened the experience in a space at once public and private".

== Awards and honours ==
- 2006: Honorary doctorate by Dartington College of Arts, in recognition of his writing for and about contemporary performance.
- 2008–2013: Etchells was the recipient of The Legacy: Thinker In Residence Award, a joint initiative by the Live Art Development Agency and Tate Research. Within the framework of this award, he produced a new publication, While You Are With Us Here Tonight (2013).

== Bibliography ==
- Endland Stories. 1999. Pulp Books
- Certain Fragments. Routledge, 1999.
- The Dream Dictionary for the Modern Dreamer. Duckworth Overlook, 2004.
- The Broken World. Heinemann, 2008.
- Vacuum Days. Storythings, 2012.
- While You are With Us Here Tonight, Live Art Development Agency; Tate Research, 2013.
- Endland. And Other Stories, 2019 (upcoming).

== Forced Entertainment performances directed by Etchells ==
- Jessica in the Room of Lights (1984)
- The Set-up (1985)
- Nighthawks (1985)
- (Let the Water Run its Course) to the Sea that Made the Promise (1986)
- The Day that Serenity Returned to the Ground (1986)
- 200% and Bloody Thirsty (1987)
- Some Confusions in the Law about Love (1989)
- Marina & Lee (1991)
- Emanuelle Enchanted (1992)
- A Decade of Forced Entertainment (1994)
- Speak Bitterness (1994)
- Hidden J (1994)
- Showtime (1996)
- Pleasure (1997)
- Dirty Work (1998)
- Disco Relax (1999)
- Scar Stories (2000)
- First Night (2001)
- Instructions for Forgetting (2001)
- The Travels (2002)
- The Voices (2003)
- Bloody Mess (2004)
- Exquisite Pain (2005)
- The World in Pictures (2006)
- Spectacular (2008)
- Void Story (2009)
- The Thrill of It All (2010)
- Tomorrow's Parties (2011)
- The Coming Storm (2012)
- The Last Adventures (2013)

== Solo visual art exhibitions ==
- 100 People and 3 People, The Gallery at Sketch, London, 2007
- Tim Etchells, Gasworks, London, UK, 2010
- Fog Game, Künstlerhaus Bremen, 2010
- From Afar, Bunkier Sztuki, Kraków, 2011
- Shouting Your Demands, Curtain Road, October 2013. Curated by Make-Room in collaboration with Duggan Morris Architects
- What is, and What is Possible, Jakopič Gallery, Ljubljana, Slovenia, 2013
- A Stitch in Time, old Rosemount Shirt Factory, Derry, part of the Lumiere light festival, 28 November – 1 December 2013, during Derry-Londonderry City of Culture 2013.

== Video works with Hugo Glendinning ==
- Starfucker, Down Time.
- Kent Beeson is a Classic & an Absolutely New Thing.
