= Forced Entertainment =

English theatre group

- Formation: 1984
- Type: Theatre group
- Location: Sheffield
- Artistic director: Tim Etchells
- Website: forcedentertainment.com

Forced Entertainment is an experimental theatre company based in Sheffield, England, founded by Tim Etchells in 1984.

== Details and history ==
Forced Entertainment originally focused on making and touring theatre performances before expanding to long durational performance, live art, video and digital media. Their work has been presented throughout the UK and Europe as well as Australia, Japan, Canada and the US. They develop projects using a collaborative process – devising work as a group through improvisation, experimentation and debate. Their core members are Tim Etchells (artistic director), Richard Lowdon (designer and performer) and performers Robin Arthur, Claire Marshall, Cathy Naden and Terry O'Connor, who have all been with the company from the start.

A book was published about them in 2004, "Not Even a Game Anymore": The Theatre of Forced Entertainment. In 2012 BBC Radio 4 aired a programme following their creative process developing, writing and rehearsing The Coming Storm.

== Projects ==
- Jessica in the Room of Lights, 1984, theatre performances
- The Set-up, 1985, theatre performances
- Nighthawks, 1985, theatre performances
- (Let the Water Run its Course) to the Sea that Made the Promise, 1986, theatre performances
- The Day that Serenity Returned to the Ground, 1986, theatre performances
- 200% and Bloody Thirsty, 1987, theatre performances
- Some Confusions in the Law about Love, 1989, theatre performances
- Marina & Lee, 1991, theatre performances
- Cardboard Sign Photographs, 1992, photography
- Emanuelle Enchanted, 1992, theatre performances
- 12 am: Awake & Looking Down, 1993, long durational performances
- Club of No Regrets, 1993, theatre performances
- Looking Forwards, 1993, photography
- Red Room, 1993, gallery/installation
- A Decade of Forced Entertainment, 1994, theatre performances
- Dreams' Winter, 1994, site-specific works
- Speak Bitterness, 1994, long durational performances
- Ground Plans for Paradise, 1994, gallery/installation
- Hidden J, 1994, theatre performances
- Hotel Photographs, 1994, photography
- Nights in this City, 1995, site-specific works
- Showtime, 1996, theatre performances
- Quizoola!, 1996, long durational performances
- Pleasure, 1997, theatre performances
- Frozen Palaces, 1997, CD-ROM/interactive
- Dirty Work, 1998, theatre performances
- Filthy Words & Phrases, 1998, film/video
- Paradise, 1998, CD-ROM/interactive
- Nightwalks, 1998, CD-ROM/interactive
- Disco Relax, 1999, theatre performances
- Who Can Sing a Song to Unfrighten Me?, 1999, long durational performances
- Spin, 1999, CD-ROM/interactive
- And on the Thousandth Night..., 2000, long durational performances
- Hotel Binary, 2000, gallery/installation
- Scar Stories, 2000, site-specific works
- Rules of the Game, 2000, gallery/installation, text/photographs
- First Night, 2001, theatre performances
- Instructions for Forgetting, 2001, theatre performances
- The Travels, 2002, theatre performances
- The Voices, 2003, theatre performances
- Imaginary Evidence, 2003, CD-ROM/interactive
- Marathon Lexicon, 2003, long durational performances
- Years 0 – 20, 2004, photography
- Bloody Mess, 2004, theatre performances
- Exquisite Pain, 2005, theatre performances
- The World in Pictures, 2006, theatre performances
- Spectacular, 2008, theatre performances
- Sight is the sense that dying people tend to lose first, 2008, theatre performances
- Void Story, 2009, theatre performances
- The Thrill of It All, 2010, theatre performances
- Tomorrow's Parties, 2011, theatre performances
- Although We Fell Short, 2011, theatre performances
- The Coming Storm, 2012, theatre performances
- The Last Adventures, 2013, theatre performances
- Complete Works: Table Top Shakespeare, 2015, performances of all 36 plays
- Real Magic, 2016, theatre performance
- Out of Order, 2018, theatre performance
- To Move in Time, 2019, theatre performance
- End Meeting For All, 2020, on-line digital film series
- How The Time Goes, 2021, on-line digital film series
- Under Bright Light, 2022, theatre performance
- If All Else Fails, 2023, theatre performance
- Signal to Noise, 2024, theatre performance

== Awards ==
- 1999 – 2nd prize for Quizoola!, Międzynarodowy Festiwal Teatralny Kontakt, Toruh / International Theatre Festival "Contact Us", Torun, Poland
- 2003 – Awarded Honorary Associates of the National Review of Live Art, at the 17th edition of the NRLA, in recognition of their outstanding contribution to the festival over many years
- 2008 – Invitation de Honor, XI Festival Iberoamericano de Teatro de Bogota, Bogotá, Colombia for Bloody Mess
- 2013 – Mammalian Diving Reflex's Children's Choice Award, Ruhrtriennale, Germany for The Last Adventures
- 2016 – International Ibsen Award
- 2017 – Theater Treffen Award Real Magic

== Reception ==
Joyce McMillan, writing in The Scotsman, called Forced Entertainment "legendary". David Tushingham, writing in the Financial Times, called them "The best group of stage actors in Britain". Robert Avila, writing in the San Francisco Bay Guardian, considered them "internationally successful and storied". Lyn Gardner, writing in The Guardian, has said that "Beyond these shores, however, the company is regarded as one of the greatest British theatrical exports of the past 20 years. ... It is this ability to smash through the pretenses of theatre that has kept the company ahead of the game." They have been described in The Guardian as having "produced some of the most exciting and challenging theatre of the past few decades". Marie-Hélène Falcon, director of Montreal's Festival de Théatre des Amériques, said of Speak Bitterness that "I had never seen anything like it before, a piece that was so political, provocative and poetic because it was a group of artists speaking about their lives – and therefore our lives – in the most direct way," "To this day, Speak Bitterness is one of the very few experiences that have radically changed my understanding and vision of theatre". The British Library claims that the group "continue to tour widely and to great acclaim throughout the world".

The British Library holds a large collection of video and audio material documenting their performances and talks.

== Publications ==
Numerous books and journals on theatre have included chapters and essays about Forced Entertainment.

- "Not Even a Game Anymore": The Theatre of Forced Entertainment. By Judith Helmer and Florian Malzacher. Berlin: Alexander Verlag Berlin, 2004. ISBN 978-3-895811-15-9.
- Certain Fragments: Contemporary Performance and Forced Entertainment. Routledge, 1999. By Tim Etchels. ISBN 978-0415173827 – hardback edition. ISBN 978-0415173834 – paperback edition. Essays and other material. With a foreword by Peggy Phelan. Illustrated with photographs by Hugo Glendinning. Includes performance texts from (Let the Water Run its Course) to the Sea that Made the Promise (1986). Emanuelle Enchanted (1992), Club of No Regrets (1993) and Speak Bitterness (1994).
- Things That Go through Your Mind When Falling: The Work of Forced Entertainment. Leipzig: Spector, 2023. ISBN 9783959053853. Edited by Adrian Heathfield. Photography by Hugo Glendinning. Performance texts by Tim Etchells and Forced Entertainment. With contributions from Robin Arthur, Sara Jane Bailes, Augusto Corrieri, Etchells, Matthew Goulish, Adrian Heathfield, Joy Kristin Kalu, Joe Kelleher, Richard Lowdon, Claire MacDonald, Claire Marshall, Rabih Mroué, Cathy Naden, Terry O'Connor, Giulia Palladini, Flora Pitrolo, Séverine Ruset, and Theron Schmidt.
