= National Review of Live Art =

Annual festival of art in the UK 1979 to 2010

The National Review of Live Art, also known by the abbreviation NRLA, was an annual festival of live art which ran from 1979 to 2010 in the United Kingdom.

== History ==
The festival owed its origins to a one-day event called simply the Performance Platform, which was organised by Steve Rogers at Nottingham's Midland Group Arts Centre in 1979. After a further Platform in 1980, the event grew into a larger, annual festival of live art which usually lasted four or five days. These were held at the Midland Group until 1987, when the NRLA, which has been under the direction of Nikki Milican since 1984, moved to London's Riverside Studios. This was the beginning of a more peripatetic existence: from 1988 - 1990 the Review took place at Glasgow's Third Eye Centre (now the Centre for Contemporary Arts); after a two-year hiatus, it returned to London, in 1993, where it was held at the Institute of Contemporary Arts (ICA), and in 1994 went back to Glasgow, where it was held at The Arches.

In 1996 the largest ever NRLA was mounted over 11 days in Glasgow with the collaboration of The Arches, the Centre for Contemporary Arts, Tramway, the University of Glasgow and Glasgow School of Art. Platform performances (work by new artists), some invited and commissioned performances, installations and video installations were presented at The Arches, while various performances, talks and workshops took place at the other venues. The decision was also taken then to turn the Review into a biennial event and the next one took place in Glasgow in October 1998. The final Review was in February 2010 at Tramway and The Arches in Glasgow.
