= Steve Reich and Musicians =

Musical ensemble founded by American composer Steve Reich

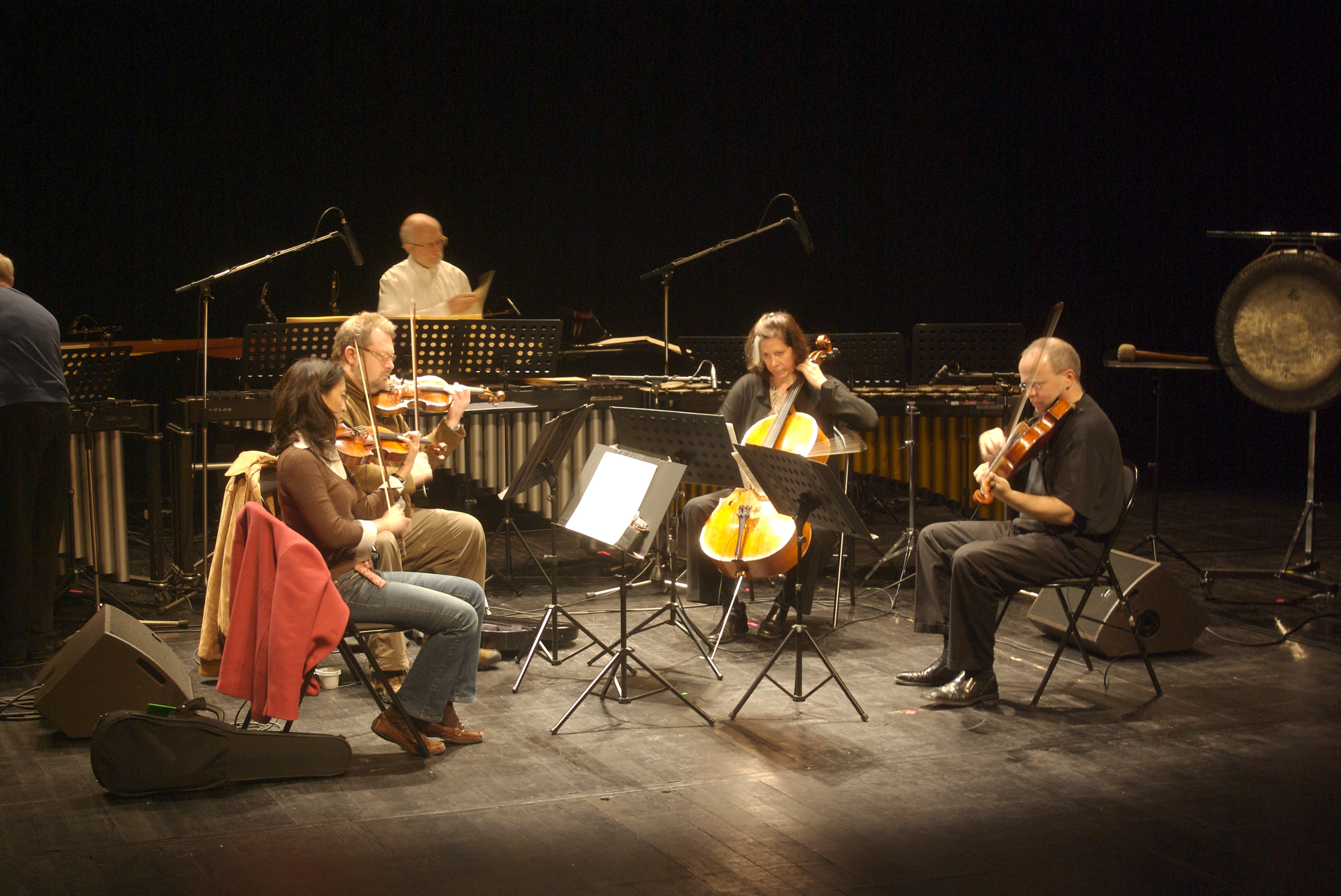
Steve Reich Ensemble playing Different Trains (from left to right) Liz Lim-Dutton, violin, Todd Reynolds, violin, Jeanne LeBlanc, cello, Scott Rawls, viola, Russ Hartenberger at the back

Steve Reich and Musicians, sometimes credited as the Steve Reich Ensemble, is a musical ensemble founded and led by the American composer Steve Reich (born 1936). The group has premiered and performed many of Reich's works both nationally and internationally. In 1999, Reich received a Grammy Award for "Best Small Ensemble Performance (With or Without Conductor)" for the ensemble's performance of Music for 18 Musicians.

== History ==
=== Early history (1966–1979) ===
In 1966, Steve Reich founded his own ensemble of four musicians. Original members included Steve Chambers (pianist), Arthur Murphy (pianist), Jon Gibson (reed player), and Reich himself. John Hartenberger joined shortly after as the first percussionist, and introduced Reich to Bob Becker. James (Jim) Preiss from the Manhattan School of Music joined the ensemble around that same time. The addition of trained percussionists to the ensemble was instrumental to the creation and premiere of Drumming in 1971, the first piece by Reich to employ percussion. Through Priess, Reich was introduced to more percussionists, including Glen Velez and Gary Schall. Garry Kvistad, a current member of Nexus, joined the group in 1980.

As the scope of Reich's compositions grew, so too did the size of his ensemble and the number of instruments utilized. In 1973, moving on from the "phase shifting" technique he had pioneered in previous works, Reich wrote Music for Mallet Instruments, Voices and Organ (1973), and Six Pianos (1973), which were more elaborate in compositional technique and performance. Both were premiered by Steve Reich and Musicians at the John Weber Gallery in New York City in 1973. In 1974, Reich began work on Music for 18 Musicians, which was his first attempt at writing for a larger ensemble. The group premiered this piece at The Town Hall in New York City in 1976, and made the premier recording of it on ECM Records in 1978. This piece is considered a pivotal point in Reich's career, marking a distinct shift toward harmony being brought to the forefront ahead of the rhythmically based style of his previous works.

During this period, the group usually gave private performances of pieces they were rehearsing in lofts and small galleries in New York City prior to the public premieres. The invited audiences for these small concerts often included artists like Sol LeWitt and Richard Serra, as well as other musicians and composers such as Philip Glass, Morton Feldman, and John Cage. The public premieres took place at venues around New York City, including the Town Hall (New York City), the Museum of Modern Art, Carnegie Hall, and Lincoln Center.

=== Recent history (1980–present) ===
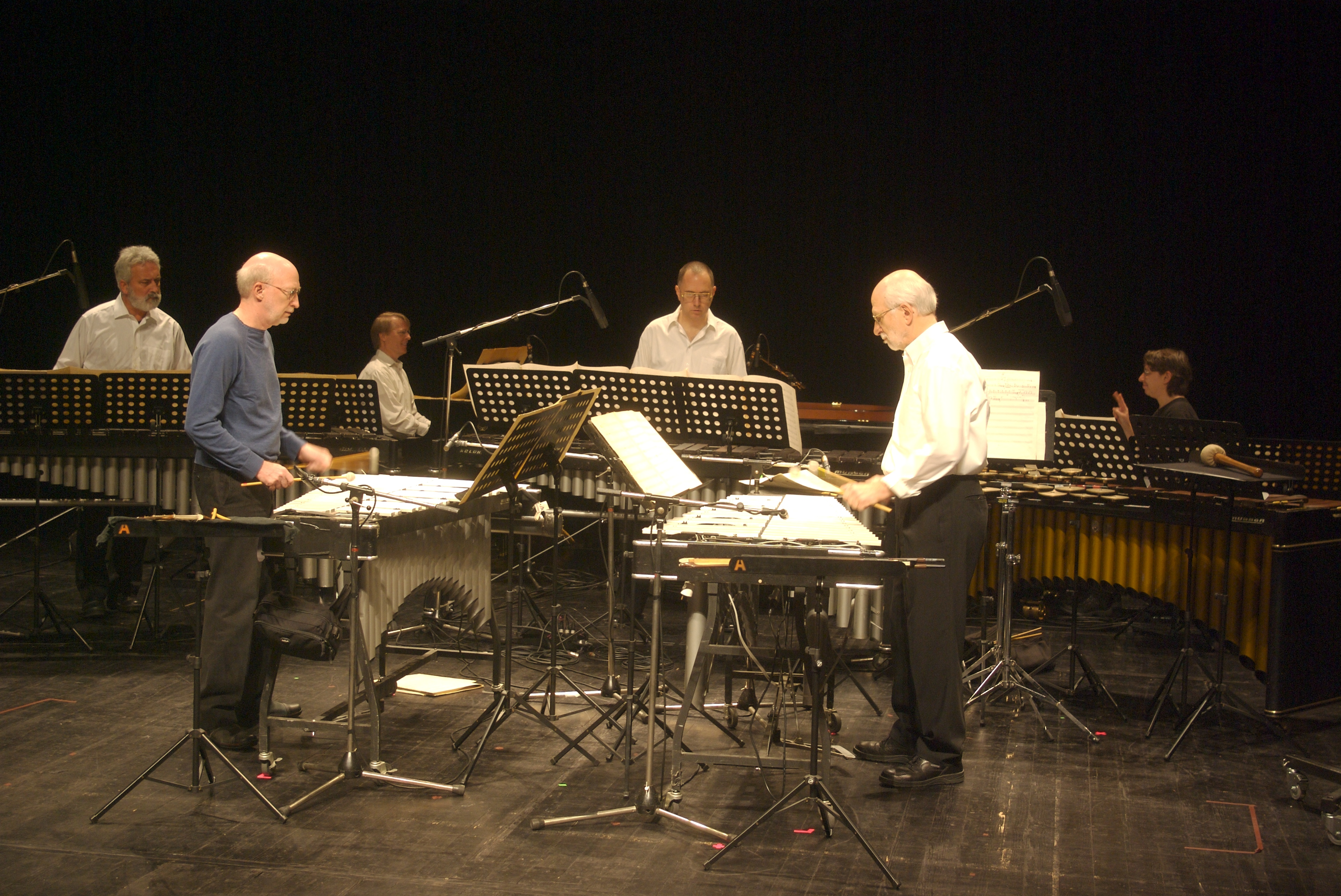
Steve Reich Ensemble rehearsing Sextet, Le Havre, France. From Left, Garry Kvistad, Bob Becker, Edmund Niemann, Thad Wheeler, Russell Hartenberger, and Nurit Tilles

The ensemble was featured at the Percussive Arts Society International Convention in 1982 in Dallas, featuring Reich, Bob Becker, Russell Hartenberger, and Glen Velez. They played Drumming, Parts I and III, Clapping Music, Marimba Phase, and Music for Pieces of Wood. In 1999, Reich received a Grammy Award for "Best Small Ensemble Performance (With or Without Conductor)" for the group's performance of the piece. Bob Becker, Russell Hartenberger, and Garry Kvistad all played on the award-winning recording.

After the success of Music for 18 Musicians, the group began touring nationally and internationally. They premiered many works overseas as well as in the United States. In 1993, they premiered The Cave (opera) in Vienna, conducted by Paul Hillier. The piece has now been presented on four continents. In 2006–2007, Reich's 70th birthday was honored with a series of multiple concerts held at Carnegie Hall, Lincoln Center, and the Brooklyn Academy of Music. These concerts featured not only Reich's ensemble, but the Kronos Quartet and Pat Metheny, who referred to the event as "one of [his] most memorable concerts.". Steve Reich and Musicians gave multiple performances of pieces like Music for 18 Musicians and Drumming, as well as the U.S premiere of Daniel Variations. In recent years, although more premieres are now given by ensembles that commission works by Reich, the Steve Reich Ensemble is still performing and touring internationally, with Reich himself occasionally performing alongside his ensemble.

== Influence ==
By organizing an ensemble of his own with which to perform his works, Reich, like fellow minimalist composer Philip Glass with his group, altered the traditional route by which classical composers sought to have their music disseminated. The composer-led ensemble became a new model which was to be highly influential on the creation of groups such as Bang on a Can.

== Size and instrumentation ==
From 1966 until Reich composed Music for 18 Musicians, the ensemble's size steadily increased from 4 to 18 players. Since then, the size of the ensemble has fluctuated depending on the works to be performed, with the aforementioned 18 musicians being approximately the upper limit. However, many works such as Piano Phase or Clapping Music use only a pair of musicians.

The ensemble's instrumentation varies according to the piece being performed. Many compositions consist primarily of tuned percussion (marimbas, vibraphones, glockenspiels) and voices, as well as bowed string instruments, bass clarinets, and electronic organs. Other ensembles feature more original instrumentation, or only the human body as in the case of pieces like Clapping Music.

== Members ==
- Steve Reich – percussion (tuned drums, marimba), piano, whistling
- Pamela Wood Ambush – vocals
- Rebecca Armstrong – vocals (soprano)
- Marion Beckenstein – vocals (soprano)
- Steve Chambers – piano – original member
- Arthur Murphy – piano – original member
- Jon Gibson – flute, saxophone – original member
- Bob Becker – percussion (tuned drums, marimba, xylophone) – original member – member of the Nexus percussion group
- Phillip Bush – piano
- Jay Clayton – vocals (alto), piano
- Tim Ferchen – percussion (marimba, xylophone)
- Ben Harms – percussion (tuned drums, marimba)
- Russell Hartenberger – percussion (tuned drums, marimba, xylophone) – original member – member of the Nexus percussion group
- Garry Kvistad – percussion (glockenspiel, marimba, xylophone), piano
- Shem Guibbory, Violin
- Jeanne LeBlanc – cello
- Richard Rood – violin
- Elizabeth Lim – violin
- Edmund Niemann – piano
- James Preiss – percussion (tuned drums), vibraphone, piano
- Joseph Rasmussen – percussion
- Scott Rawls – viola
- Todd Reynolds – violin – former member of Ethel
- Cheryl Bensman Rowe – vocals (soprano)
- Gary Schall – percussion (tuned drums)
- Leslie Scott – clarinet, bass clarinet
- Mort Silver – piccolo
- Nurit Tilles – piano, electric organ
- David Van Tieghem – percussion (glockenspiel, marimba, xylophone, tuned drums, claves), piano
- Glen Velez – percussion (tuned drums)
- Thad Wheeler – percussion (tuned drums, glockenspiel, marimba, maracas)
- Evan Ziporyn – clarinet, bass clarinet

== Discography ==
=== Steve Reich and Musicians ===
- The Desert Music – with Brooklyn Philharmonic Orchestra and Chorus, conducted by Michael Tilson Thomas – Nonesuch Records 79101
- Drumming – Nonesuch Records 79170
- Drumming, Music for Mallets, Voices and Organ, Six Pianos – Deutsche Grammophon DG 427 428-2
- Drumming – Deutsche Grammophon DG 474 323-2
- Music for a Large Ensemble, Octet, Violin Phase – ECM New Series 78118-21168
- Music for 18 Musicians – ECM New Series 78118-21129
- Music for 18 Musicians – Nonesuch Records 79448
- Sextet, Six Marimbas – Nonesuch Records 79138
- Six Pianos, Pendulum Music, Violin Phase, Music for Pieces of Wood, Drumming Part Four – live at The Kitchen 1977 – Orange Mountain Music 0018
- Tehillim – ECM New Series 21215
- Variations for Winds, Strings and Keyboards – with San Francisco Symphony, conducted by Edo de Waart – Deutsche Grammophon 20/21 Series DG 471 591-2

=== Steve Reich Ensemble ===
- The Cave – Nonesuch Records 79327
- City Life, Nagoya Marimbas, Proverb – Nonesuch Records 79430
- Three Tales – with Synergy Vocals, conducted by Bradley Lubman – Nonesuch Records 79662
