= Reich Remixed =

Remix album by Steve Reich
- Released: March 2, 1999
- Recorded: March–August 1998
- Genre: Electronic
- Length: 69:07
- Label: Nonesuch
- Producer: Amy Coffey

Reich Remixed is a remix album of music by the American composer Steve Reich. It was released in 1999 by Nonesuch Records and features tracks produced by various American, British, and Japanese DJs.

== Track listing ==
1. "Music for 18 Musicians (Coldcut remix)" – 6:03
2. "Eight Lines (Howie B remix)" – 8:12
3. "The Four Sections (Andrea Parker remix)" – 6:22
4. "Megamix (Tranquility Bass remix)" – 9:36
5. "Drumming (Mantronik Maximum Drum Formula)" – 4:02
6. "Proverb (Nobukazu Takemura remix)" – 7:44
7. "Piano Phase (D*Note's Phased and Konfused mix)" – 5:05
8. "City Life (DJ Spooky that Subliminal Kid Open Circuit)" – 6:58
9. "Come Out (Ken Ishii remix)" – 7:15

Bonus track:

10. "The Desert Music (FreQ Nasty & B.L.I.M. Remix)" – 7:22

Track 10 only appeared on the first pressing; its presence was only noted with a sticker on top of the shrink wrap. The United Kingdom and Ireland version of the CD had a different track order.

== Charts ==
Chart	Peak position
US Top Classical Albums (Billboard)	18
US Top Classical Crossover Albums (Billboard)	9
