= Tape phase =

Recorded composition using a tape loop

In music, a tape phase is a recorded composition using a tape loop or its electronic simulation to produce and vary sounds. It is a form of tape music.

Tape phase compositions generally make little use of tonality owing to the difficulty of producing and maintaining a coherent pitch. They may have a strong pulse and rhythm, as in the work of Steve Reich, or may be free form in this regard, as in the work of Jimi Hendrix.

== Techniques ==
- Flanging

== Exponents ==
- Terry Riley
- Steve Reich
- Karlheinz Stockhausen
- Jimi Hendrix
- The Beatles

== Pieces ==
- It's Gonna Rain (Reich, 1965)
- Come Out (Reich) (Reich, 1966)
- ...And the Gods Made Love (Hendrix, 1968)
- Moon, Turn the Tides...Gently Gently Away (Hendrix, 1968)
- Revolution 9 (The Beatles, 1969)

== See also ==
- Sound collage
- Noise music
- Experimental music
- Process music
- Noise in music
