= Variations for Winds, Strings and Keyboards =

1979 composition by Steve Reich

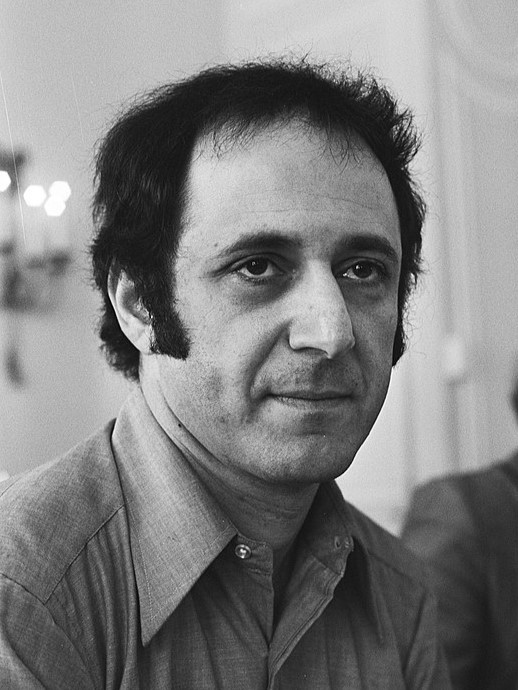
Steve Reich in 1976

Variations for Winds, Strings and Keyboards is an orchestral piece composed in 1979 by Steve Reich. The piece is scored for oboes, flutes, full brass (three trumpets, three trombones, and tuba), strings, pianos, and electric organs. Variations was Reich's first orchestral piece.

== Structure and Instrumentation ==
Reich describes the piece as being in the form of a chaconne, variations on a repeated short harmonic progression. The piece has three variations of a complete cycle of harmonic progressions (C minor to C flat, and then gradually back through several keys to C minor), moving one note of a chord at a time, a process of suspension.

The three movements are approximately six, ten, and nine minutes. The winds and keyboards (three oboes doubled by electric organs, alternating with three flutes doubled by pianos and electric organs) play the melody throughout. Harmonies are played by the strings doubled by organs. The brass add to the harmonies in the first and last sections of the piece.

The chord form for the piece was taken from the opening of the second movement of Béla Bartók's Second Piano Concerto. Reich initially wrote the first movement for only strings, with a significant amount of dissonance. He discarded that effort but kept the basic idea of suspensions, inverting the chords within a middle register to reduce the dissonance.

== Premieres ==
Variations was commissioned by the San Francisco Symphony, and is dedicated to Betty Freeman. A chamber orchestra version of the piece was performed at Carnegie Hall on February 19, 1980. This was a "preview" performance, using Reich's own musicians, to give Reich a better sense of the piece's sound before its official debut. The full orchestral version was premiered by the San Francisco Symphony at the War Memorial Auditorium in San Francisco on May 14, 1980. The UK premiere was given by the Royal Liverpool Philharmonic Orchestra on 4 October 1986.

== Commercial Recordings ==
The original commercial recording of the Variations was made by the San Francisco Symphony in 1983, with Edo de Waart conducting. That recording is available on two CDs—one on Philips, paired with John Adams's Shaker Loops, and the other on Deutsche Grammophon, accompanied by versions of Reich's Music for Mallet Instruments, Voices and Organ and Six Pianos, both performed by Reich's ensemble.

In 2006 DG Concerts released a Los Angeles Philharmonic performance of the Variations, as part of a concert that also included Reich's Three Movements and Tehillim. The concert recording is available for downloading, under the title "Minimalist Jukebox."

== Reich on the Variations ==
- "Harmonically speaking, for me, it is a very developed piece."
- "I've generally moved away from electric organs. Now, my most recent piece, the Variations for Winds, Strings, and Keyboards, uses electric organs. The important thing is that they're sandwiched inside the sounds of flute, oboe, piano, and strings. They give the acoustical sound a kind of buzz, a kind of raspy timbre that I think is very effective; it also gives the piece a continuity, binding the various orchestral elements together."
- "I don't think anybody heard the piece as derivative of Bartók, but if you listen to just the string part, there is an influence there."
- From a 2006 interview: "I am not very fond of that piece; it's not something I have a great deal of affection for."
