= Radio Rewrite =

2012 composition by Steve Reich

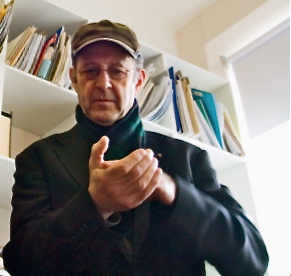
Composer Steve Reich

Radio Rewrite is a 2012 musical composition by the American composer Steve Reich, inspired by two songs by the British rock band Radiohead: "Jigsaw Falling into Place" and "Everything in Its Right Place". It is the first time that Reich has reworked material from western pop or rock music.

Radio Rewrite has five movements, alternating fast and slow, and is scored for clarinet, flute, two violins, viola, cello, two vibraphones, two pianos and electric bass. It premiered in London in 2013, performed by the London Sinfonietta, to a generally positive reception. Attention focused on the Radiohead material; some reviewers praised how completely the work is integrated, while others questioned how suited it was for Reich. Alarm Will Sound made the first recording of the piece for an album released on Nonesuch Records in 2014.

== Background ==
Reich is one of the founders of the minimalist movement in music. While his work takes inspiration from Baroque music, Igor Stravinsky, jazz, Hebrew cantillation and West African and Balinese music, the composer states that he has composed only two earlier pieces that directly reference material from existing music. His 1995 vocal work, Proverb, draws from 12th–13th century composer Pérotin; more recently, his 2011 piece for two pianos, Finishing the Hat, draws from musical writer Stephen Sondheim, Reich's near contemporary. Reich connects this practice of rewriting with a long tradition in classical music, stretching back to the early 15th century. Although he sees classical and popular music as closely linked – as he puts it, "the window is open between the street and the concert hall" – and has often composed for electronic instruments, Reich does not describe himself as a fan of rock music, and had never previously investigated the potential of western pop/rock music for such treatment.

Reich's compositions have frequently been referenced in popular music across many different genres, and his influence is apparent as an inspiration to works by Aphex Twin, Björk, David Bowie, Tyondai Braxton, Bryce Dessner, Brian Eno, Mike Oldfield, the Orb, Talking Heads, Tortoise and U2, among others. Reich says he is happy for disc jockeys to remix his work.

=== Reich and Radiohead ===
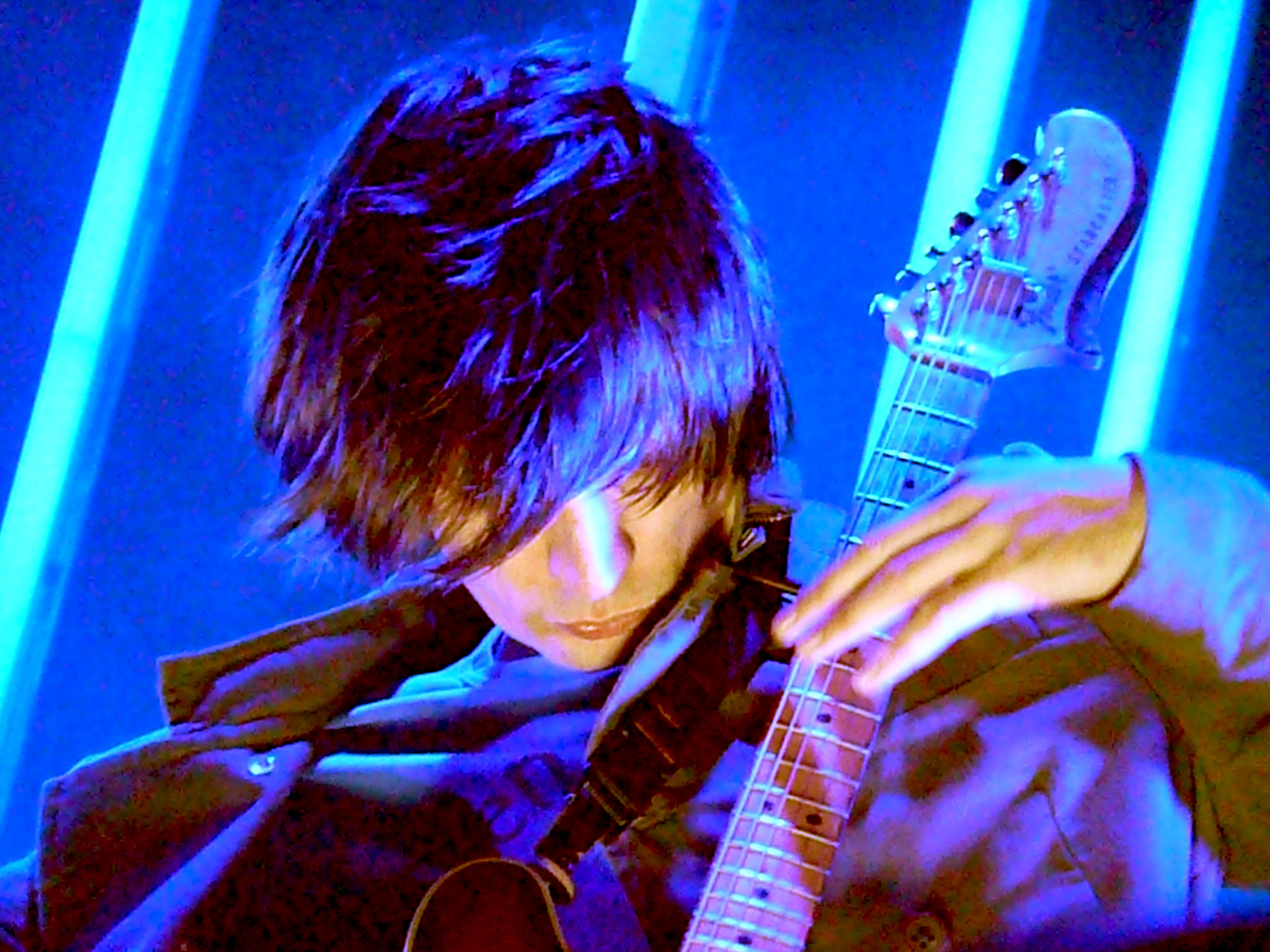
Jonny Greenwood from Radiohead

Radiohead is a British rock band formed in the mid-1980s, whose style was described in 2012 as "jazz-tinged electronic rock". Reich first encountered the lead guitarist, Jonny Greenwood, in September 2011 at the Sacrum Profanum festival in Kraków, Poland, where Greenwood was playing Reich's Electric Counterpoint with Ensemble Modern. Reich was impressed by Greenwood's performance and his varied interests as a composer and viola player. Of Greenwood's score for the film There Will Be Blood, Reich said: "Here's a guy into Messiaen. I'd never have known it was written by a rocker."

After the festival, Reich explored Radiohead's music for the first time. He described them as "an important and innovative rock group" and "definitely one of the best bands around" with "beautiful" melodic elements. He found two songs particularly memorable: "Everything in Its Right Place", from the 2000 album Kid A, and "Jigsaw Falling into Place", from the 2007 album In Rainbows. Reich described "Jigsaw" as "a beautiful song" with "elaborate harmonic movement". He described "Everything in Its Right Place" as "very rich ... very simple and very complex at the same time". "It's three-chord rock but it's not, it's very unusual." He explained that although the song is in the key F minor, the F minor chord never appears. Reich observed that the word "everything" is sung to tonic–dominant–tonic, echoing, probably unconsciously, the dominant–tonic chords that form the end of everything in classical music ... it's perfect, it is everything."

== Composition ==
In 2011, Reich was already working on a joint ensemble commission from Alarm Will Sound and London Sinfonietta, which he had originally conceived as "a giant counterpoint piece" for 15 musicians doubled against an equal number of recordings. The piece failed to come together, and Reich decided to use material in the two Radiohead songs that he found "exhilarating, energizing" to reinvigorate the project. He neither sampled the Radiohead tracks nor wrote variations on them; rather, working entirely from the sheet music, he based his composition on their underlying harmonies and incorporated short fragments of the melody. He composed the rock-inspired work for an ensemble playing almost entirely classical instruments.

Reich stated that the strongest ties to the original songs are in the first two movements, especially the fast first movement which echoes the harmonic structure of "Jigsaw" and also borrows a brief melodic element. In the slow second movement, Reich deliberately shuffled the chord progression from "Everything in Its Right Place", which he describes as "powerful," in addition to transposing it in key, to avoid drawing too heavily on the song. This section also borrows the tonic–dominant–tonic setting of the word "everything," which is additionally used in the other slow section. In the final three movements, especially the two fast ones, Reich moved further from the source material. Reich completed the piece in August 2012.

== Description ==
Radio Rewrite is scored for clarinet, flute, two violins, viola, cello, two vibraphones, two pianos and electric bass guitar. The piece lasts around 19 minutes and has five movements, which alternate fast and slow tempi and are played continuously. The three fast movements (first, third and fifth) draw from "Jigsaw Falling into Place," and the two slow from "Everything in Its Right Place". According to Reich, "As to actually hearing the original songs, the truth is – sometimes you hear them and sometimes you don't;" "...those with sharper ears may catch harmonic similarities." Reviewers noted that a brief melody from "Jigsaw" appears repeatedly in the fast movements, especially in a clarinet phrase in the final one, while the clearest influence of "Everything" is a repeated three-chord progression. According to Seth Colter Walls, writing in Slate, Reich's work has a "rhythmic complexity" that goes beyond the songs.

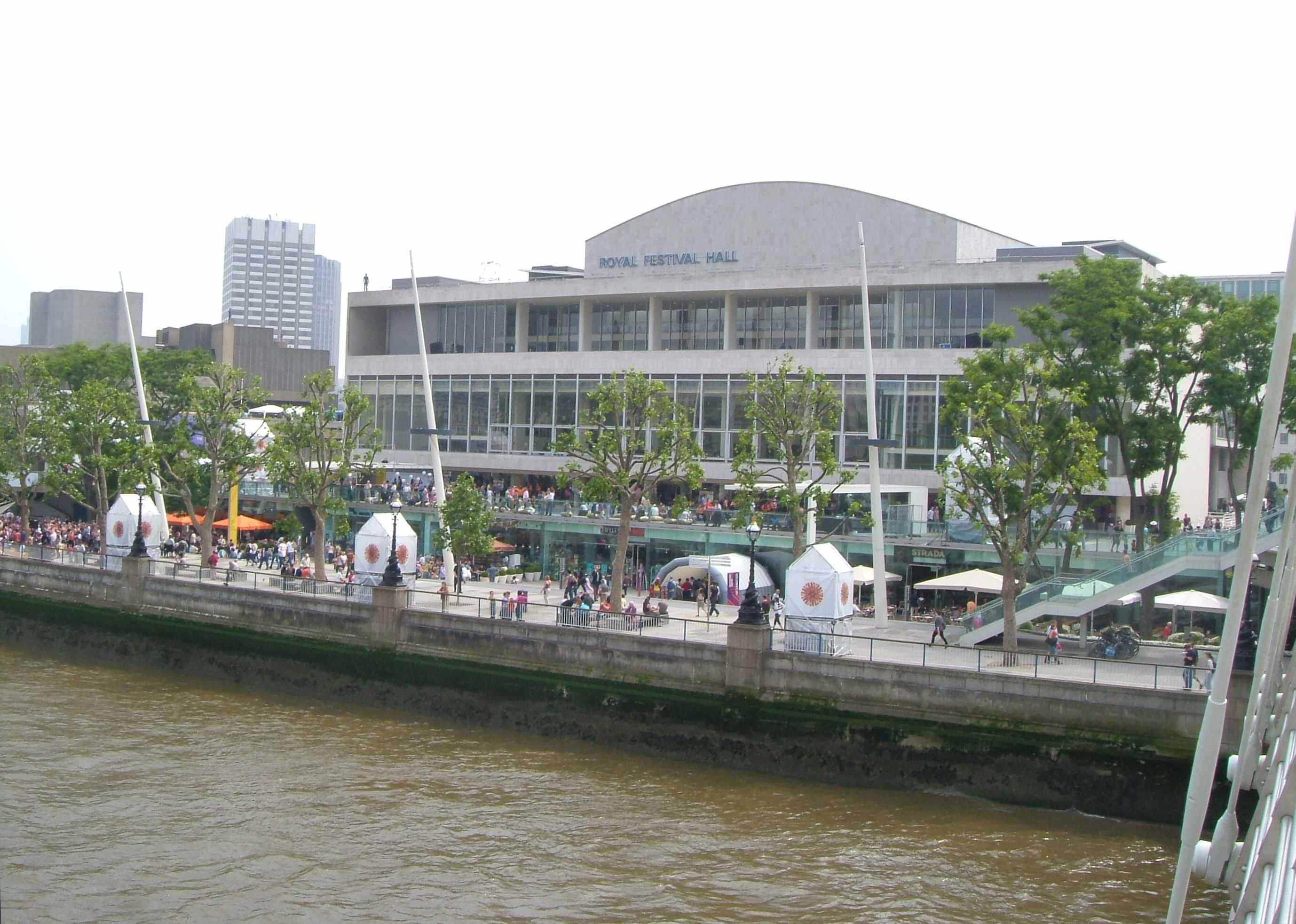
The Royal Festival Hall, London, where the work premiered

== Early performances ==
Radio Rewrite received its world premiere at the Royal Festival Hall in London, UK on March 5, 2013, performed by the London Sinfonietta, conducted by Brad Lubman. Reich manned the mixing desk for the performance. The concert was broadcast live on BBC Radio 3, with each piece introduced by an interview with Reich. Radio Rewrite was subsequently performed by the London Sinfonietta on tour across the UK. The work was commissioned jointly by the London Sinfonietta in the UK and Alarm Will Sound in the US; the US premiere was given by Alarm Will Sound on March 16, 2013, in Palo Alto, California. Alarm Will Sound went on to perform the piece across the United States including at the Metropolitan Museum of Art, Cleveland State University, and the Brooklyn Academy of Music.

== Reception ==
Radiohead bassist Colin Greenwood said in interview on BBC Radio 4's Today programme:

It's fantastic, and so exciting, I mean, I can recognise chord shapes and the cadences. ... What's interesting for me is all the vocal inflections. I can hear all the singing. His curiosity and his relationship to those chords that we've used, and repetition sort of teases them out, so it's fantastic. ... When I was listening to his work last night I was thinking about "Jigsaw" and different chord shapes, chord extensions for like bass lines, and stuff. I don't know about rethinking but just enjoying it, you know, you're seeing it through someone else's eyes, or a prism, you know, the different refraction. For that, we're all incredibly grateful.

The premiere gained substantial media attention in the UK. Radio Rewrite was generally well received by classical music critics, with the concert receiving four out of five stars in reviews by the Financial Times, The Guardian and The Telegraph, and three stars from The Independent and The Times. Laura Battle, writing in the Financial Times, described the piece as "rich and impressive," noting its atmospheric writing and "sense of wistfulness". The Telegraph's Ivan Hewett called it "a fine display of compositional mastery." Stephen Pritchard, in The Observer, described it as "instantly accessible, instantly enjoyable," and draws attention to the "pearlescent luminosity" of the vibraphones.

The Radiohead inspiration had a mixed reception. Pritchard wrote that the work is "no mere set of variations ... not so much a rewrite as a reimagining in Reich's hyperreal style." Hewett and Igor Toronyi-Lalic at theartsdesk.com praised how completely the Radiohead material was integrated; Toronyi-Lalic said it had "nothing to do with remix culture". He wrote: "The unfamiliar harmonies that Reich is forced to play with liberates him to explore a more dramatic palette. In the two slow movements, he revels in the dissonances thrown up by Everything in its Right Place, encouraging them to assume a Jewish cantor-like wail through woodwind colouring."

Other reviewers were more critical of this aspect. Dammann wrote that "the piece absorbs only a handful of gestures from the songs into an otherwise familiar compositional framework," and Battle considers the "much-hyped allusions are fleeting." Helen Wallace of BBC Music Magazine wrote: "The hope was that the Radiohead elements would ignite something, or at least disturb something, in Reich's creative process that would inspire him. In fact, he neutralised them. The result was attractive and underwhelming. ... What some of his best pieces share ... is a disruptive 'alien' element, be it African music, poetry, documentary speech or sound. Radiohead's music, perhaps, is ultimately too close to his own aesthetic." Anna Picard, in a review for The Independent, found the piece "rather bland" and one of Reich's "B-sides". She wrote that "after nearly 50 years of favouring the Early French polyphonists, modal jazz and African music as his influences, unmoved alike by disco, punk, techno, krautrock or Motown, Radiohead seems an odd place for him to start a relationship with pop: too thin, too drab, too short on ecstasy and heat."

Rock critic Peter Culshaw at theartsdesk.com described the Radiohead references as "a bit peek-a-boo and Spot That Tune". He was unconvinced by the work as a whole, writing that the slow sections showed "flashes of real beauty, over enjoyably dissonant chords, but as a whole isn't entirely satisfying. ... The slow parts at times left a queasy impression – like someone painting a strange coloured rose on top of a Mondrian or a Bridget Riley." In 2016, Andrew Clements of The Guardian listed Radio Rewrite as one of Reich's top 10 compositions.

== Recording ==
In 2014, a recording of Radio Rewrite by the ensemble Alarm Will Sound was released by Nonesuch Records. It also features a performance of Electric Counterpoint by Jonny Greenwood and Piano Counterpoint by Vicky Chow.
