= Octet/Music for a Large Ensemble/Violin Phase =

Studio album by Steve Reich
- Released: 1980
- Recorded: February and March 1980
- Genre: 20th-century classical
- Label: ECM
- Producer: Manfred Eicher

Professional ratings
Review scores
Source	Rating
AllMusic	4.5/5 stars
Christgau's Record Guide	B+
Pitchfork	8.5/10
Sputnikmusic	4/5 stars

Octet/Music for a Large Ensemble/Violin Phase is an album that consists of commissioned works by Steve Reich, recorded between February–March 1980 and released the same year on the ECM label.

Music for a Large Ensemble was commissioned by the Holland Festival, while Violin Phase was an earlier work that dealt with repetition.

== Track listing ==
All tracks are written by Steve Reich.

Side one
No.	Title	Length
1.	"Music for a Large Ensemble"	15:30
2.	"Violin Phase"	15:11

Side two
No.	Title	Length
1.	"Octet"	17:30
Total length:		48:11

== Personnel ==
Music For a Large Ensemble

- Gary Schall, Glen Velez, Richard Schwarz, Russ Hartenberger – marimba
- Bob Becker, David Van Tieghem – xylophone
- James Preiss – vibraphone
- Edmund Niemann, Larry Karush, Nurit Tilles, Steve Reich – piano
- Elizabeth Arnold, Jay Clayton – voice
- Robert Chausow, Shem Guibbory – violin
- Claire Bergman, Ruth Siegler – viola
- Chris Finckel, Michael Finckel – cello
- Judith Sugarman, Lewis Paer – double bass
- Richard Cohen, Virgil Blackwell – clarinet
- Mort Silver – flute
- Ed Joffe, Vincent Gnojek – soprano saxophone
- Douglas Hedwig, James Dooley, James Hamlin, Marshall Farr – trumpet

Violin Phase

- Shem Guibbory – violin

Octet

- Edmund Niemann, Nurit Tilles – piano
- Virgil Blackwell, Mort Silver – clarinet, bass clarinet, flute, piccolo
- Robert Chausow, Shem Guibbory – violin
- Ruth Siegler – viola
- Chris Finckel – cello
