= Music for a Large Ensemble =

1978 composition by Steve Reich

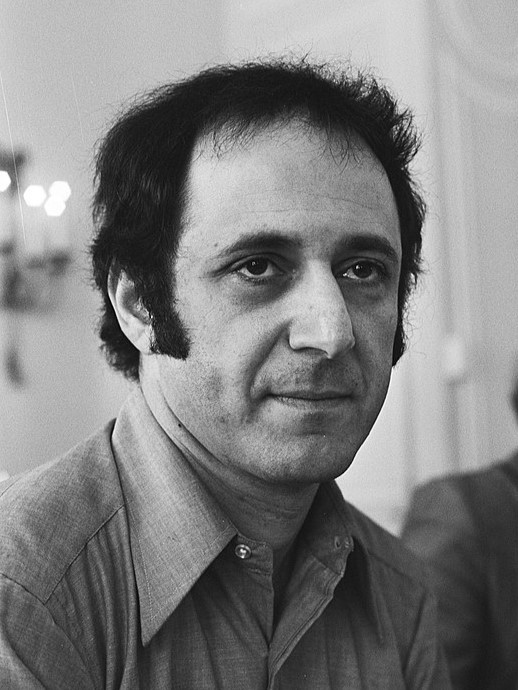
Steve Reich in 1976

Music for a Large Ensemble is a piece of music written by Steve Reich in 1978. It is scored for violin 1, violin 2, cellos, 2 flutes, 2 clarinets, 2 soprano saxophones, 4 trumpets, 4 pianos, 2 marimbas, vibraphone, 2 xylophones and two female voices.

It had its first performance in Utrecht on June 14, 1979. It was a commissioned work by the Holland Festival and it was first performed by Reich's musicians as well as members of the Netherlands Wind Ensemble. Reich noted that this piece was developed out of two pieces he had previously written, Music for Mallet Instruments, Voices and Organ and Music for 18 Musicians. The piece was written for more musicians than Reich had previously worked with, and included instruments from all sections of the orchestra, including strings, woodwinds, brass and percussion, and female voices. The piece is divided into four sections, each marked by a key change initiated by the metallophone.

As in some of his other works from the same time, Reich uses the technique of augmentation in this work, whereby short, rapid phrases are stretched out to become longer lines, which combine contrapuntally with other melodies, then using diminution they are returned to their shorter length. Each of the piece's four sections develop in an "arch" structure, ABCBA, characteristic of Reich's work at this time.

Reich explained that this piece was part of his experiment with using "the human breath as the measure of musical duration ... the chords played by the trumpets are written to take one comfortable breath to perform" (liner notes for Music for a Large Ensemble). Human voices are part of the musical palette in Music for a Large Ensemble, but there are no lyrics.

Although the piece is not one of Reich's most popular, it has been recorded several times, most recently in a performance conducted by Alan Pierson. The first recording was a release by ECM Records in 1980 along with Octet and a much older piece: Violin Phase.

Joan LaBarbara (2005, p. 17) describes the work as "a very colorful work, bright in its opening, a little dark in the second section, brighter again as it moves into the third. The first section's timbral blending of women's voices with cellos and basses is very effective within the texture. The mallet instruments, clear and solid at the beginning, gradually blend into the background as trumpets and soprano saxophones surge forward. One could watch and feel the rhythmic patterns lock into place as the players relaxed into the performance. It is a bright, joyous, and exciting work".

== Sources ==
- LaBarbara, Joan (June 1980). "Three by Reich", High Fidelity/Musical America 29, no.6: MA 12 quoted in Fink, Robert (2005). Repeating Ourselves: American Minimal Music as Cultural Practice. ISBN 0-520-24550-4.
