= Music for 18 Musicians (album) =

Studio album by Steve Reich
- Released: April 1978
- Recorded: April–December 1976
- Studio: New York City
- Genre: Minimalism
- Length: 58:55
- Label: ECM New Series 1129
- Producer: Rudolph Werner

Steve Reich chronology
Music for 18 Musicians (1978)	Octet / Music for a Large Ensemble / Violin Phase (1980)

Music for 18 Musicians is a minimalist album by composer Steve Reich recorded between April–December 1976 and released on the ECM New Series in April 1978—his first of three releases for the label. The ensemble features eighteen musicians, including Reich himself playing the part of piano and marimba, playing Reich's titular composition.

== Background ==
The album was recorded shortly after the composition's world premiere at the Town Hall in New York City on April 24, 1976.

== Reception ==
Professional ratings
Review scores
Source	Rating
AllMusic	5/5 stars
Christgau's Record Guide	A−
The Guardian	5/5 stars
Pitchfork	10/10
PopMatters	9/10 stars
Sputnikmusic	5/5 stars

Reviewing the 1978 LP in Christgau's Record Guide: Rock Albums of the Seventies (1981), Robert Christgau wrote of Music for 18 Musicians: "In which pulsing modules of high-register acoustic sound—the ensemble comprises violin, cello, clarinet, piano, marimbas, xylophone, metallophone, and women's voices—evolve harmonically toward themselves. Very mathematical, yet also very, well, organic—the duration of particular note-pulses is determined by the natural breath rhythms of the musicians—this sounds great in the evening near the sea." Rolling Stone concluded that "the harmony seems static, yet one's interest is held by the pungency of the aural color, the pulsing dynamics and Reich's periodic shifting of instrumental forces."

Critic Edward Strickland argues that Music for 18 Musicians is "the high point of ensemble music of the 1970s by composers identified as Minimalist". AllMusic wrote that "when this recording was released in 1978, the impact on the new music scene was immediate and overwhelming. Anyone who saw potential in minimalism and had hoped for a major breakthrough piece found it here. The beauty of its pulsing added-note harmonies and the sustained power and precision of the performance were the music's salient features; and instead of the sterile, electronic sound usually associated with minimalism, the music's warm resonance was a welcome change." Ottó Károlyi identifies diverse influences including jazz and Balinese musical forms and notes that the piece's vocals feature organum and conductus.

In 2003, David Bowie included it in a list of 25 of his favorite albums, "Confessions of a Vinyl Junkie", calling it "Balinese gamelan music cross-dressing as minimalism".

== Track listing ==
All tracks are written by Steve Reich.

Side one
No.	Title	Length
1.	"Pulse – Sections I–IV"	26:55

Side two
No.	Title	Length
1.	"Sections V–XI – Pulse"	32:00
Total length:		58:55

== Personnel ==
=== Steve Reich and Musicians ===
- Shem Guibbory – violin
- Ken Ishii – cello
- Elizabeth Arnold, Pamela Fraley, Rebecca Armstrong – female voice
- Nurit Tilles, Steve Chambers – piano
- Larry Karush – piano, maracas
- Gary Schall – marimba, maracas
- Bob Becker, Glen Velez, Russ Hartenberger – marimba and xylophone
- James Preiss – metallophone, piano
- Steve Reich – piano and marimba
- David Van Tieghem – marimba, xylophone, and piano
- Richard Cohen, Virgil Blackwell – clarinet and bass clarinet
- Jay Clayton – female voice and piano

=== Production ===
- Rudolph Werner – producer, recording supervision, mixing
- Klaus Hiemann – recording engineer, mixing
- Steve Reich – mixing, liner notes
- Beryl Korot – cover drawing
- Paula Bisacca – design
- Bernard Perrine, Betty Freeman, Guido Harari, Mary Lucier, Patrick Bertrand, Roberto Masotti – backliner photos
