= City Life (music) =

1995 composition by Steve Reich

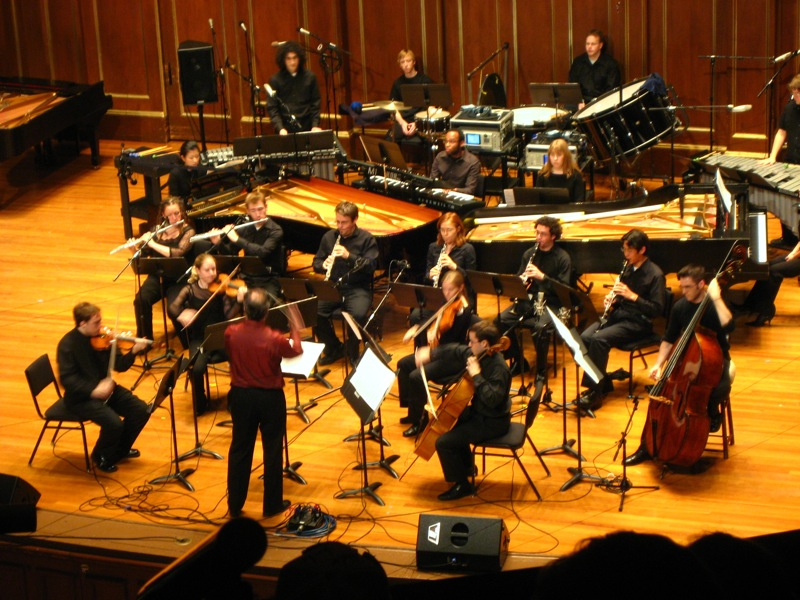
A performance of City Life, at New England Conservatory, 2007

City Life is a minimalist composition by Steve Reich written in 1995. The work was commissioned by Ensemble Modern, the London Sinfonietta, and the Ensemble Intercontemporain. The work was first performed on 7 March 1995, conducted by David Robertson. It was recorded on the Nonesuch label in 1996 and included on Steve Reich: Works 1965–1995.

The piece is scored for 2 flutes, 2 oboes, 2 clarinets, 2 vibraphones, unpitched percussion, 2 samplers, 2 pianos, string quartet, and double bass. All instruments except the unpitched percussion are to be amplified. A typical performance lasts about 24 minutes.

City Life uses digital samplers amongst the instruments used in performance, and these play back a wide variety of sounds and speech samples, mainly recorded by Reich himself in and around his home town of New York City. These sounds include car horns, air brakes, car alarms and many other sounds associated with the city. The use of the samplers extends the idea of using everyday sounds in music, indebted to the taxi horn in Gershwin's An American in Paris, the sirens used by Varèse, and Antheil's airplane propeller within the classical tradition as well as to rock and roll and rap. This use also harkens back to Reich's early tape pieces, such as It's Gonna Rain or Come Out.

The samplers are loaded with speech and other common sounds from a busy city (car horns, door slams, air brakes, subway chimes, pile drivers, car alarms, heartbeats, boat horns, buoys, and sirens). The last movement uses bits of field communications from the New York Fire Department during the 1993 bombing of the World Trade Center. The recordings also include fragments of speech, some of which have their 'speech melody' performed by the other instruments. A normal element of speech is intonation, and in this work Reich transfers intonational patterns to instrumental melody notation. Reich first used this technique in Different Trains, following the earlier example of Scott Johnson's John Somebody.

The Bluecoats Drum and Bugle Corps featured a section of movement one, "Check it out" in their 2013 production "...To Look for America."

== Movements ==
The work is divided into five movements, and like many other Reich compositions they follow an arch-like form of A-B-C-B-A. They are:

1. Check it out
2. Pile driver/alarms
3. It's been a honeymoon—can't take no mo'
4. Heartbeats/boats and buoys
5. Heavy smoke

Each movement is named for a sample contained within it. The first, third, and fifth movements use speech samples (often doubled with instruments, as in Different Trains), while the second and fourth use only rhythmic samples, which drives the tempo in these movements.

In true Reich style, the paired movements share a chord cycle. The first movement does not open with pulses (as in many of Reich's other pieces), but with a chorale. This same chorale appears in a slightly more dissonant voicing at the end of the fifth movement, leading the final chord which ends on an ambiguous C dominant/minor seventh chord.
