= Harlem Six =

Six men accused of murder in 1965

The Harlem Six was the name applied to six men in Harlem, New York, who were put on trial in March 1965. The media also referred to them as the Blood Brothers. Their arrests and subsequent trial stemmed from their connection with an incident known as the Little Fruit Stand Riot, which was followed twelve days later by an attack on a couple who owned a used clothing store in Harlem: Margit Sugar was fatally stabbed, and her husband Frank Sugar was injured.

The Harlem Six were Wallace Baker, Daniel Hamm, William Craig, Ronald Felder, Walter Thomas, and Robert Rice. Four of them were retried together and released in 1973. Daniel Hamm was released in 1974, and Robert Rice in 1991.

== The Little Fruit Stand Riot ==
On April 17, 1964, a fruit stand was knocked over and the owner blew a whistle to stop children taking his spilled fruit. The whistle alerted members of a special tactical patrol stationed in various basements throughout the community. The children tried to run away, but were beaten by the police. Several adults attempting to intervene were also beaten. Frank Stafford, a black salesman, sought to halt the attack and was battered so severely that he lost an eye. Frank Stafford, Wallace Baker, and Daniel Hamm were all taken to the hospital following the riot.

The owner of the fruit stand told police that Wallace Baker and Daniel Hamm had nothing to do with the fruit stand incident. They had only been involved in their attempt to protect children from the brutality of the police.

== Murder of Margit Sugar, stabbing of Frank Sugar, and arrests ==
On April 29, 1964 Margit and Frank Sugar were stabbed in their used clothing store. They were both taken to the hospital, but Margit Sugar did not survive and died from the stabbing. Frank Sugar survived after receiving emergency surgery.

Four individuals whom police identified at the scene of "the Little Fruit Stand Riot" were taken in for questioning (Perlstein’s Justice, Justice claims three of the six). Along with the other four members, Robert Barnes was taken in, as was Wallace Baker, who had been recently released from Harlem Hospital. Daniel Hamm, William Craig, Ronald Felder, Walter Thomas, and Robert Rice, all teenagers, were arrested. The NAACP found the case too controversial and assembled a defense team to handle the trials of those arrested, including William Kunstler, who would later become famous for arguing for the defendants of the Attica Prison riot.

The judge, reading from a precedent established in 1901, decided that "indigent paupers, such as these boys, and most Negroes now appearing in white courts can have no part in selecting the counsel authorized to be assigned to him by the court and paid for by the county." The teenagers were assigned public defenders they neither wanted nor trusted. The teenagers went so far as to ask their mothers to request different lawyers than had been assigned to them.

An investigative article by The New York Times claimed a connection between the Fruit Stand Riot and militant bands of anti-white youth gangs "trained to maim and kill" and "roam the streets of Harlem attacking white people."

While awaiting trial, the Harlem Six were regularly beaten by guards. The prison elevators would be stopped between floors so the guards could administer beatings and seek confessions. Some of the court-appointed lawyers urged the defendants to plead guilty to lesser charges, leading the defendants to claim to the judge that they could not get justice in "white man’s court." After that statement, the judge sent the accused to a mental hospital to question their sanity.

== Court case and retrial ==
In March 1965, the court case began for the Harlem Six. The Harlem Six were found guilty of first degree murder and sentenced to life in prison.

Three years after the conviction, prominent black civil rights lawyer Conrad Lynn, along with William Kunstler and others, mounted an appeal. The convictions were reversed, and new trials were ordered. The court overturned the convictions of the six defendants because the confessions of two of the defendants had been obtained and used at their first trial in violation of constitutional standards.

Two of the original six were tried separately and found guilty again.

The other four went on trial in February 1971. The trial ended with a deadlocked jury and so the judge declared a mistrial. Bail was set at $75,000 for each defendant. The men could not afford the bail, and at this point had spent eight years in prison. Ultimately, all but one of the men were found not guilty. Robert Rice was again convicted of first degree murder on May 7, 1970, and is currently still incarcerated.

== Response from community ==
Malcolm X, in his autobiography, documents his response when a young doctor asked him if he knew that some members of the New York City press were upset about a recent killing in Harlem—for which many were blaming him, at least indirectly. Malcolm informed the man that he had not heard of the incident, but that none of the violence came as a surprise to him. When he returned to New York, he was confronted by press, but seized it as an opportunity to excoriate white supremacy and the pervasiveness of racism in America.

Ossie Davis and James Baldwin, among other Black artists and activists played a role in the release of the Harlem Six. James Baldwin's piece "A Report from Occupied Territory" outlines the racial tensions surrounding the arrest and trial of the Harlem Six.

== In popular culture ==
Come Out, a 1966 composition by Steve Reich, uses a tape-loop of Hamm's voice.
