= Drumming (Reich) =

1970–1971 composition by Steve Reich

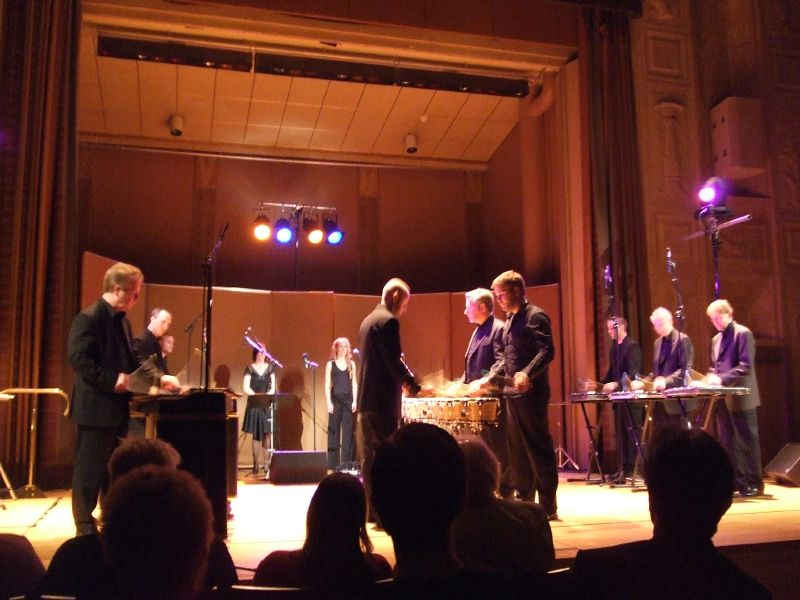
Performance by Kroumata of Drumming at the Stockholm Concert Hall, May 2007

Drumming is a piece by American minimal composer Steve Reich, dating from 1970–1971. Reich began composition of the work after a short visit to Ghana and observing music and musical ensembles there, especially under the Anlo Ewe master drummer Gideon Alorwoyie. His visit was cut short after contracting malaria. Classical music critic K. Robert Schwarz describes the work as "minimalism's first masterpiece".

== Compositional style ==
=== Phasing ===
The piece employs Reich's trademark technique of phasing. Phasing is achieved when two players, or one player and a recording, are playing a single repeated pattern in unison, usually on the same kind of instrument. One player changes tempo slightly, while the other remains constant, and eventually the two players are one or several beats out of sync with each other. They may either stay there, or phase further, depending on the piece.

=== Other techniques ===
K. Robert Schwarz characterized Drumming as a "transitional" piece between Reich's early, more austere compositions and his later works that use less strict forms and structure. Schwarz has also noted that Reich made use of three new techniques, for him, in this work:

1. "the process of gradually substituting beats for rests (or rests for beats) within a constantly repeating rhythmic cycle", or "rhythmic construction" and "rhythmic reduction"
2. combination of instruments of different timbres at the same time
3. incorporation of human voices in imitation of the sounds of the percussion instruments in the ensemble, including whistling effects

== Instrumentation and form ==
In total, the work requires 9 percussionists. With the additional players, the piece can be performed by 12 or 13 players.

The work falls into four parts, with the following instrumentation used in each:

- Part One: 4 pairs of tuned bongo drums, played with double-ended wooden sticks (and one male voice, according to the original score)
- Part Two: 3 marimbas, 2 or 3 female voices
- Part Three: 3 glockenspiels, whistler, and piccolo
- Part Four: complete ensemble

The length of the piece can vary widely, as the number of repeats taken on any given measure is up to the performers. Recordings of the piece span between 55 and 84 minutes.

The entire piece is structured around a single repeated rhythm, one measure of 12/8 long. This rhythm is built up note by note, in the "substitution of beats for rests" technique found in other of Reich's works such as Music for Pieces of Wood, Octet, Music for 18 Musicians, and others. After the rhythm is completely built up, two of the players phase to where they are playing the same pattern one quarter-note apart from each other, and the other bongo players play resulting patterns that can be heard as a result of the combination of the phased patterns.

The rest of the piece continues to use the techniques of beat/rest substitution, phasing, and resultant patterns through its four movements. The transitions consist as follows:

- Movement 2 begins with three marimba players playing exactly the same repeated pattern as the bongo players, fading in while the bongo players fade out.
- Movement 3 begins similarly; three glockenspiel players begin doubling the marimbas (which by now are playing in their upper ranges), fading in while the marimbas fade out.
- Movement 4 begins after movement 3 reduces its texture to one glockenspiel player, playing a single repeated note from the original pattern. Marimba and bongo players join, and build the pattern up again, note by note, until all nine percussionists are playing. The piece ends abruptly, on cue.

=== Variations in movement 4 ===
In the end of movement 4, in parts 7–9 there is a variation of the rhythmic pattern that Reich uses throughout the piece. Instead of repeating exactly the same motives at a different rhythmic interval, Reich leaves a note out of each final pattern in those parts. Adam Sliwinski, a member of the percussion quartet Sō Percussion, noticed this. Sō Percussion had been performing and teaching Drumming. At first Sliwinski thought it might have been accidental and decided to email Reich to see whether the composer had made a mistake. Reich replied that it was not a mistake, but that it sounds better that way, as the entire pattern would make it sound too heavy. Sliwinski notes that he was surprised by this response, as he had known Reich to strictly adhere to the processes he used in his compositions. While this is true for his earlier work, Reich has diverged from strict processes in his later works.

== Collaborations ==
Choreographers such as Laura Dean, Anne Teresa De Keersmaeker, and Ginette Laurin have collaborated on dance performances with Reich on Drumming.

== Recordings ==
- 1971 – Gary Burke, Steve Chambers, Ben Harms, Russ Hartenberger, Frank Maefsky, Art Murphy, James Ogden, James Preiss (percussion); Jon Gibson (percussion, piccolo); Steve Reich (percussion, voice, whistling); Jay Clayton, Joan La Barbara, Judy Sherman (voice) (John Gibson + Multiples Inc. 72-750125; a limited edition of 500 signed and numbered copies with printed and signed score, released in 1972). Recorded on December 16, 1971, live at Town Hall, New York. Duration 1:21:35
- 1972 - Jay Clayton, Joan La Barbara, Judith Sherman, Stephen Chambers, Jon Gibson, Russell Hartenberger, Art Murphy, James Preiss, Steve Reich, Gavin Bryars, Cornelius Cardew, Christopher Hobbs, Michael Nyman. BBC Radio 3 broadcast on 14th September 1972 a recording "by the composer and an ensemble of American and English musicians during his visit to this country in February". The recording filled a 1:40 program slot.
- 1974 – Bob Becker, Cornelius Cardew, Steve Chambers, Tim Ferchen, Ben Harms, Russ Hartenberger, James Preiss, Glen Velez (percussion); Steve Reich (percussion, whistling); Leslie Scott (piccolo); Jay Clayton, Joan La Barbara (voice) (Deutsche Grammophon 3 LPs 2740 106; issued on CD in the 20th Century Classics series in 1996, again as part of the 20/21 Echo Series in 2003, and again as part of the C20 series in 2012. Re-issued on vinyl in 2016.) Duration 1:24:29.
- 1987 – Steve Reich and Musicians (Nonesuch/Elektra 79170; also included on Steve Reich: Works 1965–1995). Duration 56:42.
- 2002 – Ictus Ensemble (Cypres CYP5608). Duration 54:49.
- 2005 – Sō Percussion; Eric Lesser (piccolo); Rebecca Armstrong, Jay Clayton (voice) (Cantaloupe Music CA21026). Duration 1:14:02.
- 2018 – Colin Currie Group, Synergy Vocals. (Colin Currie Records CCR0001). Duration 55:07.
- 2018 – Kuniko Kato (Linn Records CKD 582). Duration 1:10:02.
