= WTC 9/11 =

2009 composition by Steve Reich

WTC 9/11 is a composition by Steve Reich for string quartet written in 2009–2010 which premiered on March 19, 2011 at Duke University. The piece was written for the Kronos Quartet, who performed the premiere, and was co-commissioned by Barbican Centre, Carnegie Hall, Duke University, the University of Illinois at Urbana–Champaign, the Philharmonic Society of Orange County, the Phyllis C. Wattis Foundation, Chamber Music America and the National Endowment for the Arts. The piece is approximately fifteen minutes long, and draws inspiration from the events of September 11, 2001. In 2019, writers of The Guardian ranked it the 17th greatest work of art music since 2000.

== Background ==
The project began when the Kronos Quartet asked Reich to write a piece that utilized pre-recorded voice parts to go along with the music. Reich recalled an idea he had in 1973 of drawing out the end of the speaker's words. In January 2010, Reich decided to use voice recordings related to the September 11 attacks, specifically recordings from the North American Aerospace Defense Command (NORAD) and the New York City Fire Department (FDNY), as well as parts of interviews with friends and neighbors of Reich that lived in Manhattan at the time of the attacks. Reich's son, daughter-in law, and granddaughter were staying in Reich's apartment, four blocks from the World Trade Center, at the time of the attacks. WTC 9/11 is the third "major commission" for Reich to write for the Kronos Quartet.

== Movements ==
WTC 9/11 consists of three movements, listed below, although there is no pause between movements, and the tempo is consistent throughout the entire piece. The three movements last approximately fifteen and a half minutes in total. Reich stated that he tried to make it longer, but that "the piece wanted to be terse."

1. 9/11
2. 2010
3. WTC

September 11 NORAD communications
Reich altered NORAD radio communications like this one and integrated them into WTC 9/11.

The first movement, "9/11", begins and ends with a violin imitating the sound a phone makes when left off the hook. Voice recordings in this section begin with NORAD air traffic controllers concerned with the off-track American Airlines Flight 11, and move to FDNY recordings related to activities on the ground. Voice recordings in the second movement consist of parts of interviews conducted in 2010 by Reich. In addition to voice recordings, two string quartets are pre-recorded for the performance. Alternatively, the piece can be performed by three string quartets with pre-recorded voices only.

== Performances ==
The premiere of WTC 9/11 took place on March 19, 2011 at Duke University, and was performed by the Kronos Quartet. The piece was also performed at Carnegie Hall in April, and Barbican Centre in May. It was later performed at (Le) Poisson Rouge in New York City on September 11, 2012 by the American Contemporary Music Ensemble (ACME).

== Album artwork controversy ==
The first recording of the piece, released by Nonesuch Records on September 20, 2011, initially featured a photograph of the twin towers of the World Trade Center during the attacks. The use of the image was widely criticized, some accusing Nonesuch of exploiting the attacks for commercial purposes. Composer Phil Kline stated that the artwork is "the first truly despicable classical album cover" that he had ever seen. Seth Colter Walls of Slate criticized the artwork because it misrepresents the music by only dealing with the day of the attacks itself, whereas the piece focuses more on the aftermath of the attacks. Anne Midgette of The Washington Post disagreed with those who felt that the cover was insensitive. Midgette stated that the cover "clearly reflects the content of the album" and that the emotional response to the image was clouding others' judgement: "this picture evokes a strong reaction, so it must be bad." Nonesuch released a statement from Reich on August 12 announcing that the cover would be changed, stating that he did not want the cover to distract listeners from the music.
