= Cello Counterpoint =

2003 composition by Steve Reich

Cello Counterpoint is a composition for cello and pre-recorded tape by the American composer Steve Reich. The work was jointly commissioned by the Koussevitzky Foundation in the Library of Congress, the Royal Conservatory of The Hague, and Leiden University for the cellist Maya Beiser. It was given its world premiere by Beiser on October 18, 2003 at the Krannert Center for the Performing Arts. The piece was a finalist for the 2004 Pulitzer Prize for Music.

== Composition ==
Cello Counterpoint has a duration of roughly 11 minutes and is composed in three movements:

1. Fast
2. Slow
3. Fast

The composition is scored for eight cellos and can either be performed by a solo cello, with the seven other parts played on a pre-recorded tape, or by a cello octet. In the score program notes, Reich described the piece as one of the most difficult he had ever written, noting "extremely tight, fast moving rhythmic relationships not commonly found in the cello literature."

== Reception ==
Reviewing a recording of the Cello Counterpoint, Ivan Moody of Gramophone wrote, "Beiser manages to make the eight parts sound very often as though they were one gigantic humming, strumming instrument, and while at times Reich's contrapuntal chugging seems a little worthy, there's no doubt that this is a work of real substance (and one that must be extremely effective heard live)." The work was similarly praised by Allan Kozinn of The New York Times.
