= Music for Ensemble and Orchestra =

Musical composition by Steve Reich

Music for Ensemble and Orchestra is a 2018 orchestral work by American composer Steve Reich The work was first performed in 2019.
