= Four Organs =

1970 composition by Steve Reich

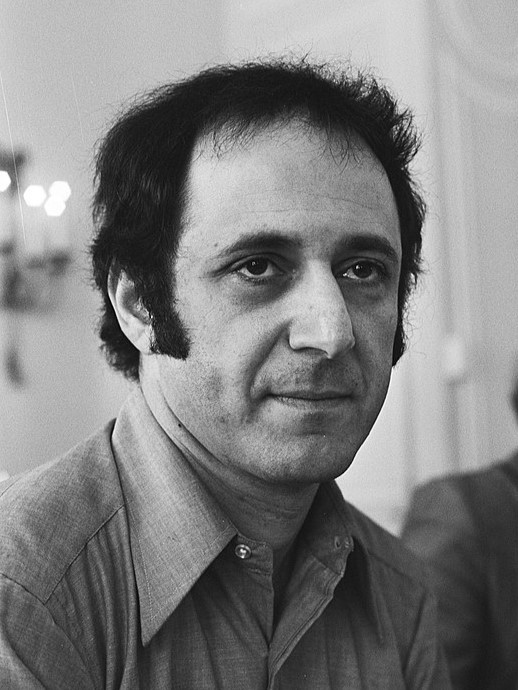
Steve Reich in 1976

Four Organs is a work for four electronic organs and maraca, composed by Steve Reich in January 1970.

== Music ==
The four organs harmonically expound a dominant eleventh chord (E–D–E–F♯–G♯–A–B), dissecting the chord by playing parts of it sequentially while the chord slowly increases in duration from a single 1/8 note at the beginning to 200 beats at the end. The process of increased augmentation is accomplished first by causing notes to sustain after the chord, and then notes start anticipating the chord. As the piece progresses, this "deconstruction" of the chord emphasizes certain harmonies. At the climax of the work, each tone sounds almost in sequence. A continuous maraca beat serves as a rhythmic framework.

Reich describes the piece as "the longest V–I cadence in the history of Western Music", the V and I chords being contained within the one chord. "You'll find the chord in Debussy and Thelonious Monk – the tonic on top and the dominant on the bottom." He has cited the music of Pérotin and other twelfth- and thirteenth-century composers as suggesting the technique of note augmentation used in Four Organs.

For performances of the piece, Reich recommended using electronic organs with as plain and simple a timbre as possible, without vibrato, to avoid the sound of the instrument itself distracting from the harmonic and rhythmic aspects of the piece. Reich himself employed four Farfisa "mini compact" models.

A typical performance lasts around 16 minutes.

== Performances ==
Four Organs was first performed in May 1970 at the Guggenheim Museum in New York City. It was received well at the premiere, and performances later that year in the United States and Europe received respectful, and in some cases enthusiastic, responses.

Subsequent audiences were not always as polite. October 1971 performances by Reich and members of the Boston Symphony (at Symphony Hall, Boston) received a combination of "loud cheers, loud boos, and whistles."

A 1973 performance of Four Organs at Carnegie Hall in New York City nearly caused a riot, with "yells for the music to stop, mixed with applause to hasten the end of the piece." One of the performers, Michael Tilson Thomas, recalls: "One woman walked down the aisle and repeatedly banged her head on the front of the stage, wailing 'Stop, stop, I confess.'"

== Cover artwork ==
Reich’s 1970 recording of Four Organs uses the film Wavelength’s closing photograph for its cover artwork.

== See also ==
- List of classical music concerts with an unruly audience response

== Notes ==
References

- Reich, Steve (April 1, 2002). Hillier, Paul (ed.). Writings on Music, 1965–2000. USA: Oxford University Press. pp. 48–50. ISBN 0-19-511171-0.
- Steve Reich: Works 1965–1995 (Nonesuch 79451-2, 1997), interview with Jonathan Cott, p. 33.
