= Steve Reich =

American composer (born 1936)

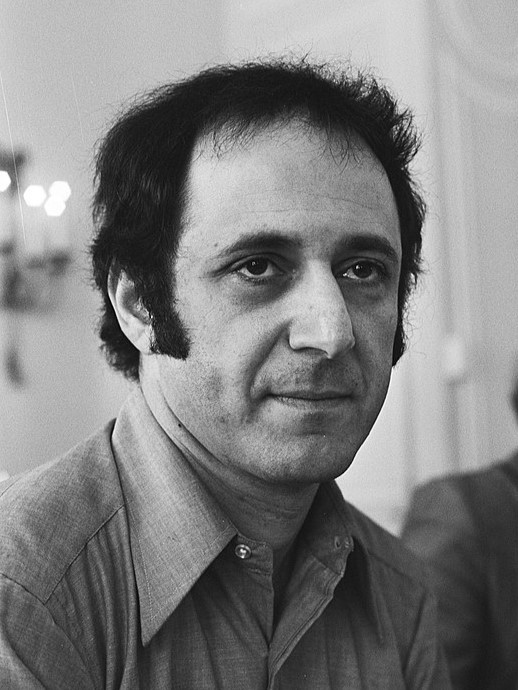
- Reich at the Holland Festival, c. June 1976
- Born: October 3, 1936 (age 90); New York City, U.S.
- Era: Contemporary
- Notable work: Piano Phase; Clapping Music; Drumming; Music for 18 Musicians; Different Trains; Three Tales; WTC 9/11
- Website: stevereich.com

Stephen Michael Reich (/raɪʃ/ RYSHE; born October 3, 1936) is an American composer best known as a pioneer of minimal music in the mid to late 1960s. Reich's work is marked by its use of repetitive figures, slow harmonic rhythm, and canons. Reich describes this concept in his essay "Music as a Gradual Process" by stating, "I am interested in perceptible processes. I want to be able to hear the process happening throughout the sounding music." For example, his early works experiment with phase shifting, in which one or more repeated phrases plays slower or faster than the others, causing it to go "out of phase." This creates new musical patterns in a perceptible flow.

Reich's innovations include using tape loops to create phasing patterns, as on the early compositions It's Gonna Rain (1965) and Come Out (1966), and the use of simple, audible processes, as on Pendulum Music (1968) and Four Organs (1970). Works like Drumming (1971) and Music for 18 Musicians (1976), both considered landmarks of minimalism and important influences on experimental music, rock, and contemporary electronic music, would help entrench minimalism as a movement. Reich's work took on a darker character in the 1980s with the introduction of historical themes as well as themes from his Jewish heritage, notably Different Trains (1988).

Reich's style of composition has influenced many contemporary composers and groups, especially in the United States and Great Britain. The critic Andrew Clements has suggested that Reich is one of "a handful of living composers who can legitimately claim to have altered the direction of musical history".

== Early life ==
Reich was born in New York City to Jewish parents, the Broadway lyricist June Sillman and attorney Leonard Reich. When he was one year old, his parents divorced, and Reich divided his time between New York and California. He is the half-brother of writer Jonathan Carroll. He was given piano lessons as a child and describes growing up with the "middle-class favorites", having no exposure to music written before 1750 or after 1900. At the age of 14 he began to study music in earnest, after hearing music from the Baroque period and earlier, as well as music of the 20th century. Reich studied drums with Roland Kohloff in order to play jazz. While attending Cornell University, he minored in music and graduated in 1957 with a B.A. in Philosophy. Reich's B.A. thesis was on Ludwig Wittgenstein; later he would set texts by that philosopher to music in Proverb (1995) and You Are (variations) (2006).

For a year following graduation, Reich studied composition privately with Hall Overton before he enrolled at Juilliard to work with William Bergsma and Vincent Persichetti (1958–1961). Subsequently, he attended Mills College in Oakland, California, where he studied with Luciano Berio and Darius Milhaud (1961–1963) and earned a master's degree in composition. At Mills, Reich composed Melodica for melodica and tape, which appeared in 1986 on the three-LP release Music from Mills.

Reich worked with the San Francisco Tape Music Center along with Pauline Oliveros, Ramon Sender, Morton Subotnick, Phil Lesh and Terry Riley. He was involved with the premiere of Riley's In C and suggested the use of the eighth note pulse, which is now standard in performance of the piece.

== Career ==
=== 1960s ===
Reich's early forays into composition involved experimentation with twelve-tone composition, but he found the rhythmic aspects of the number twelve more interesting than the pitch aspects. Reich also composed film soundtracks for Plastic Haircut (1963), Oh Dem Watermelons (1965), and Thick Pucker (1965), three films by Robert Nelson. The soundtrack of Plastic Haircut, composed in 1963, was a short tape collage, possibly Reich's first. The Watermelons soundtrack used two 19th-century minstrel tunes as its basis, and used repeated phrasing together in a large five-part canon. The music for Thick Pucker arose from street recordings Reich made walking around San Francisco with Nelson, who filmed in black and white 16mm. This film no longer survives. A fourth film from 1965, about 25 minutes long and tentatively entitled "Thick Pucker II", was assembled by Nelson from outtakes of that shoot and more of the raw audio Reich had recorded. Nelson was not happy with the resulting film and never showed it.

Reich was influenced by fellow minimalist Terry Riley, whose work In C combines simple musical patterns, offset in time, to create a slowly shifting, cohesive whole. Reich adopted this approach to compose his first major work, It's Gonna Rain. Composed in 1965, the piece used a fragment of a sermon about the end of the world given by a Black Pentecostal street-preacher known as Brother Walter. Reich built on his early tape work, transferring the last three words of the fragment, "it's gonna rain!", to multiple tape loops that gradually move out of phase with one another.

The 13-minute Come Out (1966) uses similarly manipulated sound collage recordings of a single spoken line given by Daniel Hamm, one of the falsely accused Harlem Six, who was severely injured by police. The survivor, who had been beaten, punctured a bruise on his own body to convince police to allow him to receive medical aid for his injury from the police beating. Out of Hamm's spoken line "I had to, like, open the bruise up and let some of the bruise blood come out to show them," Reich rerecorded the fragment "come out to show them" on two channels, which are initially played in unison. They quickly slip out of sync; gradually the discrepancy widens and becomes a reverberation. The two voices then split into four, looped continuously, then eight, and continues splitting until the actual words are unintelligible, leaving the listener with only the speech's rhythmic and tonal patterns.

In Melodica (1966), Reich applies the phase looping approach of his previous works to a musical instrument. He started by playing and recording a simple melody on a melodica. He then places the recording on two separate channels, and by slowly moving them out of phase creates an intricate interlocking melody. This piece is very similar to Come Out in rhythmic structure, and is an example of how one rhythmic process can be realized in different sounds to create two different pieces of music. Reich was inspired to compose this piece from a dream he had on May 22, 1966, and put the piece together in one day. Melodica was the last piece Reich composed solely for tape, and he considers it his transition from tape music to instrumental music.

Reich's first attempt at translating this phasing technique from recorded tape to live performance was the 1967 Piano Phase, for two pianos. In Piano Phase the performers repeat a rapid twelve-note melodic figure, initially in unison. As one player keeps tempo with robotic precision, the other speeds up very slightly until the two parts line up again, but one sixteenth note apart. The second player then resumes the previous tempo. This cycle of speeding up and then locking in continues throughout the piece; the cycle comes full circle three times, the second and third cycles using shorter versions of the initial figure. Violin Phase, also written in 1967, is built on these same lines. Piano Phase and Violin Phase both premiered in a series of concerts given in New York art galleries.

A similar, lesser known example of this so-called process music is Pendulum Music (1968), which consists of the sound of several microphones swinging over the loudspeakers to which they are attached, producing feedback as they do so. "Pendulum Music" has never been recorded by Reich himself, but was introduced to rock audiences by Sonic Youth in the late 1990s.

Reich also tried to create the phasing effect in a piece "that would need no instrument beyond the human body". He found that the idea of phasing was inappropriate for the simple ways he was experimenting to make sound. Instead, he composed Clapping Music (1972), in which the players do not phase in and out with each other, but instead one performer keeps one line of a 12-eighth-note-long (12-quaver-long) phrase and the other performer shifts by one eighth note beat every 12 bars, until both performers are back in unison 144 bars later.

The 1967 prototype piece Slow Motion Sound was not performed although Chris Hughes performed it 27 years later as Slow Motion Blackbird on his Reich-influenced 1994 album Shift. It introduced the idea of slowing down a recorded sound until many times its original length without changing pitch or timbre, which Reich applied to Four Organs (1970), which deals specifically with augmentation. The piece has maracas playing a fast eighth note pulse, while the four organs stress certain eighth notes using an 11th chord. This work therefore dealt with repetition and subtle rhythmic change. In contrast to Reich's typical cyclical structure, Four Organs is unique among his work in using a linear structure—the superficially similar Phase Patterns, also for four organs but without maracas, is (as the name suggests) a cyclical phase piece similar to others composed during the period. Four Organs was performed as part of a Boston Symphony Orchestra program, and was Reich's first composition to be performed in a large traditional setting.

=== 1970s ===
In June 1970, Reich travelled to the University of Ghana to study polyrhythmic music for five weeks with the Ewe master drummer Gideon Alorwoyie. From this experience, as well as A. M. Jones's Studies in African Music about the music of the Ewe people, Reich drew inspiration for his extensive piece Drumming (1970–1971), which he started to compose shortly after his return. Composed for a nine-piece percussion ensemble with female voices and piccolo, Drumming marked the beginning of a new stage in his career, for around this time he formed his ensemble, Steve Reich and Musicians, and increasingly concentrated on composition and performance with them. Steve Reich and Musicians was the sole ensemble to interpret his works for many years, and they remain a "living laboratory" for his music. The ensemble still remains active with many of its original members.

After Drumming, Reich moved on from the "phase shifting" technique that he had pioneered, and began writing more elaborate pieces. He started investigating other musical processes such as augmentation (the temporal lengthening of phrases and melodic fragments). In the summers of 1973 and 1974, he studied Balinese gamelan semar pegulingan and gambang (at Seattle and Berkeley). This experience influenced the composition of Music for Mallet Instruments, Voices and Organ (1973). Another work from this period is Six Pianos (1973).

In 1974, Reich began writing Music for 18 Musicians. This piece involved many new ideas, although it also recalls earlier pieces. It is based on a cycle of eleven chords introduced at the beginning (called "Pulses"), followed by a small section of music based on each chord ("Sections I-XI"), and finally a return to the original cycle ("Pulses II"). This was Reich's first attempt at writing for larger ensembles. The increased number of performers resulted in more scope for psychoacoustic effects, which fascinated Reich, and he noted that he would like to "explore this idea further". Reich remarked that this one work contained more harmonic movement in the first five minutes than any other work he had written. Steve Reich and Musicians made the premier recording of this work on ECM Records.

One of Reich’s characteristic compositional strategies for his minimalist work is his omission of bass notes to avoid tonal structure. “The reason lay in his antipathy to the functionality, which Reich thought inevitable, of the bass in determining and spelling out a tonal center and the relationships developed around this”. "Music for 18 Musicians” maintains his minimalist feel through these “phases” and harmonic shifts. A piece with rich tonal exploration about an hour’s length performance can only provide so much melodic opportunity, so repetitive rhythmic structure also plays a large role in this.

Reich explored these ideas further in his frequently recorded pieces Music for a Large Ensemble (1978) and Octet (1979). In these two works, Reich experimented with "the human breath as the measure of musical duration ... the chords played by the trumpets are written to take one comfortable breath to perform". Human voices are part of the musical palette in Music for a Large Ensemble but the wordless vocal parts simply form part of the texture (as they do in Drumming). With Octet and his first orchestral piece Variations for Winds, Strings and Keyboards (also 1979), Reich's music showed the influence of Biblical cantillation, which he had studied in Israel since the summer of 1977. After this, the human voice singing a text would play an increasingly important role in Reich's music.

The technique ... consists of taking pre-existing melodic patterns and stringing them together to form a longer melody in the service of a holy text. If you take away the text, you're left with the idea of putting together small motives to make longer melodies – a technique I had not encountered before.

In 1974 Reich published the book Writings About Music, containing essays on his philosophy, aesthetics, and musical projects written between 1963 and 1974. An updated and much more extensive collection, Writings On Music (1965–2000), was published in 2002.

=== 1980s ===
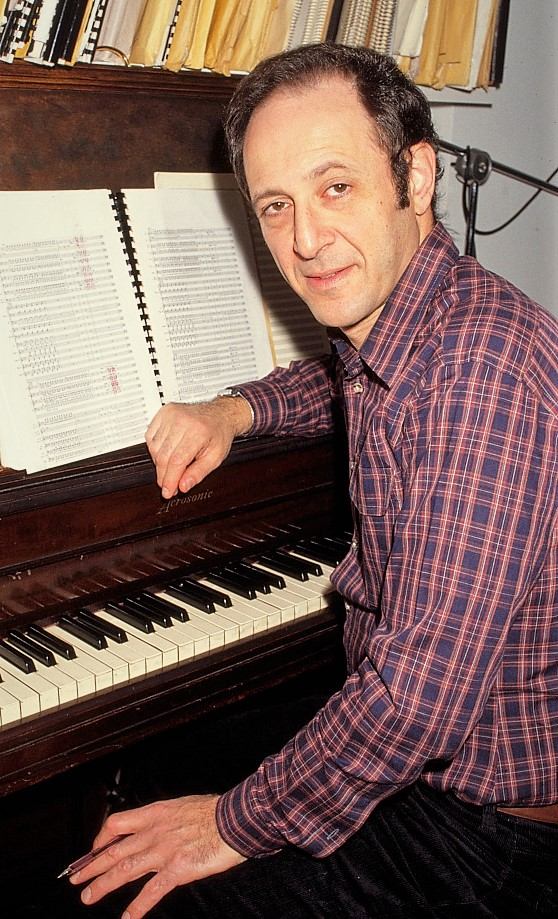
Reich circa 1982–1984

Reich's work took on a darker character in the 1980s with the introduction of historical themes as well as themes from his Jewish heritage. Tehillim (1981), Hebrew for psalms, is the first of Reich's works to draw explicitly on his Jewish background. The work is in four parts, and is scored for an ensemble of four women's voices (one high soprano, two lyric sopranos and one alto), piccolo, flute, oboe, English horn, two clarinets, six percussion (playing small tuned tambourines without jingles, clapping, maracas, marimba, vibraphone and crotales), two electronic organs, two violins, viola, cello and double bass, with amplified voices, strings, and winds. A setting of texts from Psalms 19:2–5 (19:1–4 in Christian translations), 34:13–15 (34:12–14), 18:26–27 (18:25–26), and 150:4–6, Tehillim is a departure from Reich's other work in its formal structure; the setting of texts several lines long rather than the fragments used in previous works makes melody a substantive element. Use of formal counterpoint and functional harmony also contrasts with the loosely structured minimalist works written previously. The musicologist Ronit Seter described it as "one of a very few non-Israeli works where the setting of the Hebrew text feels natural", reflecting Reich's extensive research into modern Hebrew-Israeli speech, ancient Psalmic prosody and Jewish cantillation traditions.

"Electric Counterpoint III Fast" (1989)
25 seconds of "Electric Counterpoint III Fast" performed by Pat Metheny. From Different Trains/Electric Counterpoint album.

Different Trains (1988), for string quartet and tape, uses recorded speech, as in his earlier works, but this time as a melodic rather than a rhythmic element. In Different Trains, Reich compares and contrasts his childhood memories of his train journeys between New York and California in 1939–1941 with the very different trains being used to transport contemporaneous European children to their deaths under Nazi rule. The Kronos Quartet recording of Different Trains was awarded the Grammy Award for Best Classical Contemporary Composition in 1990. The composition was described by Richard Taruskin as "the only adequate musical response—one of the few adequate artistic responses in any medium—to the Holocaust", and he credited the piece with earning Reich a place among the great composers of the 20th century.

=== 1990s ===
In 1993, Reich collaborated with his wife, the video artist Beryl Korot, on an opera, The Cave, which explores the roots of Judaism, Christianity and Islam through the words of Israelis, Palestinians, and Americans, echoed musically by the ensemble. The work, for percussion, voices, and strings, is a musical documentary, named for the Cave of Machpelah in Hebron, where a mosque now stands and Abraham is said to have been buried. According to musicologist Ronit Seter, the work "share[s] the confrontational, yet peaceful message" conveyed by contemporaneous Israeli composers.

Reich and Korot collaborated on the opera Three Tales, which concerns the Hindenburg disaster, the testing of nuclear weapons on Bikini Atoll, and other more modern concerns, specifically Dolly the sheep, cloning, and the technological singularity.

Reich used sampling techniques for pieces like Three Tales and City Life from 1994. Reich returned to composing purely instrumental works for the concert hall, starting with Triple Quartet in 1998 written for the Kronos Quartet that can either be performed by string quartet and tape, three string quartets or 36-piece string orchestra. According to Reich, the piece is influenced by Bartók's and Alfred Schnittke's string quartets, and Michael Gordon's Yo Shakespeare.

=== 2000s ===
The instrumental series for the concert hall continued with Dance Patterns (2002), Cello Counterpoint (2003), and multiple works centered around variations: You Are (Variations) (2004), Variations for Vibes, Pianos, and Strings (2005), and the Daniel Variations (2006). You Are looks back to the vocal writing of Tehillim and The Desert Music while the Daniel Variations, which Reich called "much darker, not at all what I'm known for", are partly inspired by the death of Daniel Pearl.

In 2002 Reich was invited by Walter Fink to the annual Komponistenporträt of the Rheingau Musik Festival, as the 12th composer featured.

In December 2010 Nonesuch Records and Indaba Music held a community remix contest in which over 250 submissions were received, and Steve Reich and Christian Carey judged the finals. Reich spoke in a related BBC interview that once he composed a piece he would not alter it again himself; "When it's done, it's done," he said. On the other hand, he acknowledged that remixes have an old tradition e.g. famous religious music pieces where melodies were further developed into new songs.

=== 2010s ===
Reich premiered a piece, WTC 9/11, written for String Quartet and Tape (a similar instrumentation to that of Different Trains) in March 2011. This was a response to the September 11 attacks and used recordings from emergency services and from family members who were in New York during the attacks. It was premiered by the Kronos Quartet, at Duke University, North Carolina, US.

On March 5, 2013, the London Sinfonietta, conducted by Brad Lubman, at the Royal Festival Hall in London gave the world premiere of Radio Rewrite, Reich's work inspired by the band Radiohead. The programme also included Double Sextet, Clapping Music, featuring Reich himself alongside percussionist Colin Currie, Electric Counterpoint, with electric guitar by Mats Bergström as well as two of Reich's ensemble pieces.

In September 2014 for the 50th anniversary of Nonesuch Records, Reich reunited with Philip Glass at the Brooklyn Academy of Music.

Music for Ensemble and Orchestra was premiered on November 4, 2018 by the Los Angeles Philharmonic under Susanna Mälkki at Walt Disney Concert Hall, marking Reich's return to writing for orchestra after an interval of more than thirty years.

Reich has lived with his wife Beryl Korot in a home in upstate New York since 2006.

== Awards ==
In 2005, Reich was awarded the Edward MacDowell Medal.

Reich was awarded with the Praemium Imperiale Award in Music in October 2006.

On January 25, 2007, Reich was named 2007 recipient of the Polar Music Prize with jazz saxophonist Sonny Rollins.

On April 20, 2009, Reich was awarded the 2009 Pulitzer Prize for Music, recognizing Double Sextet, first performed in Richmond March 26, 2008. The citation called it "a major work that displays an ability to channel an initial burst of energy into a large-scale musical event, built with masterful control and consistently intriguing to the ear".

In May 2011 Steve Reich received an honorary doctorate from the New England Conservatory of Music.

In 2012, Steve Reich received the Gold Medal in Music by the American Academy of Arts and Letters.

In 2013 Reich received the US$400,000 BBVA Foundation Frontiers of Knowledge Award in contemporary music for bringing a new conception of music, based on the use of realist elements from the realm of daily life and others drawn from the traditional music of Africa and Asia.

In September 2014, Reich was awarded the "Leone d'Oro" (Golden Lion for Lifetime Achievement in Music) from the Venice Biennale.

In March 2016, Reich was awarded an Honorary Doctorate by the Royal College of Music in London.

== Legacy ==
The American composer and critic Kyle Gann has said that Reich "may ... be considered, by general acclamation, America's greatest living composer". Writing in The Guardian, music critic Andrew Clements has suggested that Reich is one of "a handful of living composers who can legitimately claim to have altered the direction of musical history".

Reich's style of composition has influenced many other composers and musical groups, including John Adams, Michael Nyman, Aphex Twin, Björk, Sonic Youth, Brian Eno, American Football, Stereolab, King Crimson, Autechre, Matmos, Michael Hedges, the Residents, Underworld, Other Lives, the composers associated with the Bang on a Can festival (including David Lang, Michael Gordon, and Julia Wolfe), Sufjan Stevens, Matthew Healy of the 1975, Tortoise, The Mercury Program, JG Thirlwell, Godspeed You! Black Emperor (which titled an unreleased song "Steve Reich"), and George Winston.

John Adams commented, "He didn't reinvent the wheel so much as he showed us a new way to ride." He has also influenced visual artists such as Bruce Nauman, and many notable choreographers have made dances to his music, Eliot Feld, Jiří Kylián, Douglas Lee and Jerome Robbins among others; he has expressed particular admiration of Anne Teresa De Keersmaeker's work set to his pieces.

In featuring a sample of Reich's Electric Counterpoint (1987) in the 1990 track Little Fluffy Clouds the British ambient techno act the Orb exposed a new generation of listeners to his music. In 1999 the album Reich Remixed featured remixes of a number of Reich's works by various electronic dance-music producers, such as DJ Spooky, Kurtis Mantronik, Ken Ishii, and Coldcut among others.

Reich's Cello Counterpoint (2003) was the inspiration for a series of commissions for solo cello with pre-recorded cellos made by Ashley Bathgate in 2017 including new works by Emily Cooley and Alex Weiser.

Reich often cites Pérotin, J. S. Bach, Debussy, Bartók, and Stravinsky as composers whom he admires and who greatly influenced him when he was young. Jazz is a major part of the formation of Reich's musical style, and two of the earliest influences on his work were vocalists Ella Fitzgerald and Alfred Deller, whose emphasis on the artistic capabilities of the voice alone with little vibrato or other alteration was an inspiration to his earliest works. John Coltrane's style, which Reich has described as "playing a lot of notes to very few harmonies", also had an impact; of particular interest was the album Africa/Brass, which "was basically a half-an-hour in E". Reich's influence from jazz includes its roots, also, from the West African music he studied in his readings and visit to Ghana. Other important influences are Kenny Clarke and Miles Davis, and visual artist friends such as Sol LeWitt and Richard Serra. Reich has also stated that he admires the music of the band Radiohead, which led to his composition Radio Rewrite.

== Works ==
=== Compositions ===
- Pitch Charts variable instrumentation (1963)
- Soundtrack for Plastic Haircut tape (1963)
- Music for two or more pianos (1964)
- Livelihood (1964)
- It's Gonna Rain tape (1965)
- Soundtrack for Oh Dem Watermelons tape (1965)
- Come Out tape (1966)
- Melodica for melodica and tape (1966)
- Reed Phase for soprano saxophone or any other reed instrument and tape, or three reed instruments (1966)
- Piano Phase for two pianos, or two marimbas (1967)
- Slow Motion Sound concept piece (1967)
- Violin Phase for violin and tape or four violins (1967)
- My Name Is for three tape recorders and performers (1967)
- Pendulum Music for 3 or 4 microphones, amplifiers and loudspeakers (1968) (revised 1973)
- Pulse Music for phase shifting pulse gate (1969)
- Four Log Drums for four log drums and phase shifting pulse gate (1969)
- Four Organs for four electric organs and maracas (1970)
- Phase Patterns for four electric organs (1970)
- Drumming for 4 pairs of tuned bongo drums, 3 marimbas, 3 glockenspiels, 2 female voices, whistling and piccolo (1970/1971)
- Clapping Music for two musicians clapping (1972)
- Music for Pieces of Wood for five pairs of tuned claves (1973)
- Six Pianos (1973) – also arranged as Six Marimbas (1986), adapted as Six Marimbas Counterpoint (2010) and Piano Counterpoint (2011) by the others
- Music for Mallet Instruments, Voices and Organ (1973)
- Music for 18 Musicians (1974–76)
- Music for a Large Ensemble (1978, rev. 1979)
- Octet (1979) – withdrawn in favor of the 1983 revision for slightly larger ensemble, Eight Lines
- Variations for Winds, Strings and Keyboards for orchestra (1979)
- Tehillim for voices and ensemble (1981)
- Vermont Counterpoint for amplified flute and tape (1982)
- The Desert Music for chorus and orchestra or voices and ensemble (1983, text by William Carlos Williams)
- Sextet for percussion and keyboards (1984, rev. 1985)
- New York Counterpoint for amplified clarinet and tape, or 11 clarinets and bass clarinet (1985)
- Three Movements for orchestra (1986)
- Electric Counterpoint for electric guitar or amplified acoustic guitar and tape (1987, for Pat Metheny)
- The Four Sections for orchestra (1987)
- Different Trains for string quartet and tape (1988)
- The Cave for four voices, ensemble and video (1993, with Beryl Korot)
- Duet for two violins and string ensemble (1993, dedicated to Yehudi Menuhin)
- Nagoya Marimbas for two marimbas (1994)
- City Life for amplified ensemble (1995)
- Proverb for voices and ensemble (1995, text by Ludwig Wittgenstein)
- Triple Quartet for amplified string quartet (with prerecorded tape), or three string quartets, or string orchestra (1998)
- Know What Is Above You for four women's voices and 2 tamborims (1999)
- Three Tales for video projection, five voices and ensemble (1998–2002, with Beryl Korot)
- Dance Patterns for 2 xylophones, 2 vibraphones and 2 pianos (2002)
- Cello Counterpoint for amplified cello and multichannel tape (2003)
- You Are (Variations) for voices and ensemble (2004)
- For Strings (with Winds and Brass) for orchestra (1987/2004)
- Variations for Vibes, Pianos, and Strings dance piece for 3 string quartets, 4 vibraphones, and 2 pianos (2005)
- Daniel Variations for four voices and ensemble (2006)
- Double Sextet for 2 violins, 2 cellos, 2 pianos, 2 vibraphones, 2 clarinets, 2 flutes or ensemble and pre-recorded tape (2007)
- 2×5 for 2 drum sets, 2 pianos, 4 electric guitars and 2 bass guitars (2008)
- Mallet Quartet for 2 marimbas and 2 vibraphones or 4 marimbas (or solo percussion and tape) (2009)
- WTC 9/11 for string quartet and tape (2010)
- Finishing the Hat for two pianos (2011)
- Radio Rewrite for ensemble (2012)
- Quartet for two vibraphones and two pianos (2013)
- Pulse for winds, strings, piano and electric bass (2015)
- Runner for large ensemble (2016)
- For Bob for piano (2017)
- Music for Ensemble and Orchestra (2018)
- Reich/Richter for large ensemble (2019)
- Traveler's Prayer for 2 tenors, 2 sopranos, 2 vibraphones, 1 piano, 4 violins, 2 violas and 2 cellos (2020)
- Two Pianos (2020)
- Jacob's Ladder for 4 vocalists and large ensemble (2023)
- In All Your Ways for 2 flutes, 2 clarinets, 2 marimbas, 2 vibraphones, 2 pianos, and string quartet (2026)

=== Selected discography ===
- Live/Electric Music, (Columbia Masterworks, 1968)
- Four Organs for four electric organs and maracas (Shandar, 1970; recorded again for Angel, 1973)
- Music for 18 Musicians (ECM, 1978); later: Grand Valley State University New Music Ensemble (Innova), Ensemble Modern (RCA Red Seal); Ensemble Signal, Brad Lubman harmonia mundi
- Radio Rewrite, Ensemble Signal, Brad Lubman harmonia mundi
- Double Sextet, Ensemble Signal, Brad Lubman harmonia mundi
- Drumming. Steve Reich and Musicians (a few recordings: John Gibson + Multiples, 1971; Deutsche Grammophon and Nonesuch) So Percussion (Cantaloupe)
- Music for 18 Musicians. Steve Reich and Musicians (Two recordings: ECM and Nonesuch, 1978), Grand Valley State University New Music Ensemble (Innova), Ensemble Modern (RCA Red Seal).
- Octet/Music for a Large Ensemble/Violin Phase. Steve Reich and Musicians (ECM, 1980)
- Variations for Winds, Strings and Keyboards/Music for Mallet Instruments, Voices and Organ/ Six Pianos. San Francisco Symphony Orchestra, Edo de Waart, Steve Reich & Musicians (Philips, 1984)
- Tehillim/The Desert Music (ECM Records, 1982); Alarm Will Sound and OSSIA, Alan Pierson (Cantaloupe)
- Different Trains/Electric Counterpoint. Kronos Quartet, Pat Metheny (Elektra Nonesuch, 1989)
- Steve Reich: Works 1965–1995. Various performers (Nonesuch, 1997).
- Piano Phase, transcribed for guitar, Alexandre Gérard (Catapult)
- Reich Remixed, (Nonesuch, 1999)
- You Are (Variations)/Cello Counterpoint. Los Angeles Master Chorale, Grant Gershon, Maya Beiser (Nonesuch, 2005)
- Daniel Variations, with Variations for Vibes, Pianos and Strings. London Sinfonietta, Grant Gershon, Alan Pierson (Nonesuch, 2008)
- Double Sextet/2×5, Eighth Blackbird and Bang on a Can (Nonesuch, 2010)
- Radio Rewrite, Alarm Will Sound, Jonny Greenwood, Vicky Chow (Nonesuch, 2014)
- Pulse – Quartet, International Contemporary Ensemble, Colin Currie Group (Nonesuch, 2018)

=== Filmography ===
- Phase to Face, a film documentary about Steve Reich by Eric Darmon & Franck Mallet (EuroArts, 2011) DVD

=== Books ===
- Reich, Steve (1974). Writings About Music. Halifax: Press of the Nova Scotia College of Art and Design. ISBN 978-0-8147-7358-1.
- Reich, Steve (April 1, 2002). Hillier, Paul (ed.). Writings on Music, 1965–2000. Oxford: Oxford University Press. ISBN 978-0-19-511171-2.
- Reich, Steve (2022). Conversations. New York City: Hanover Square Press. ISBN 978-1-335-42572-0.
