= Daniel Variations =

2006 composition by Steve Reich

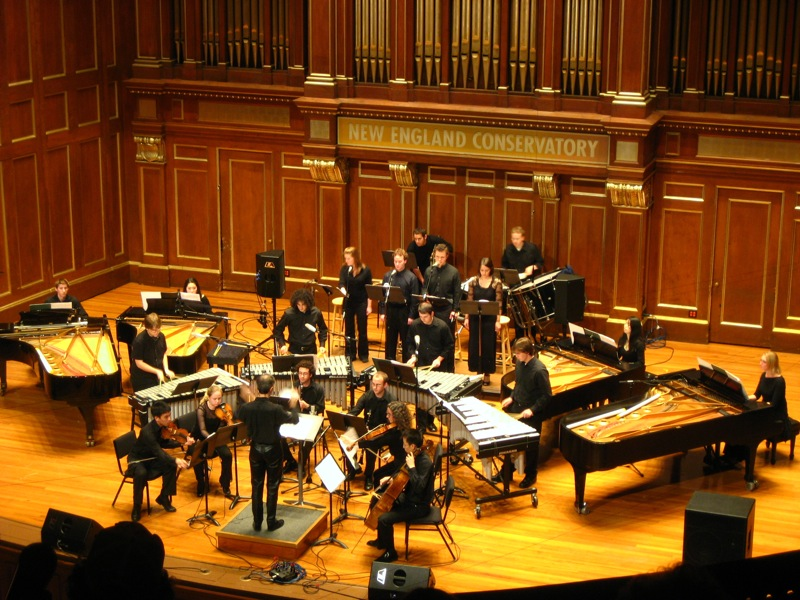
Daniel Variations, New England Conservatory, November 2007

Daniel Variations is a composition for large ensemble written by American composer Steve Reich in 2006. It is scored for two soprano and two tenor voices, two clarinets, four pianos, string quartet, and six percussion players (playing bass drum, gong, and four vibraphones). Daniel Variations is in four movements. The first and third movements quote verses from the biblical book of Daniel, while the second and fourth movements use the words of Daniel Pearl, a Jewish American reporter who was kidnapped and murdered by Islamic fundamentalists in Pakistan in 2002.

The texts for the movements are:

1. I saw a dream. Images upon my bed and visions in my head frightened me. (Daniel 4:2, or 4:5 in Christian translations)
2. My name is Daniel Pearl. (I'm a Jewish American from Encino California.)
3. Let the dream fall back onto the dreaded. (Daniel 4:16, or 4:19 in Christian translations)
4. I sure hope that Gabriel likes my music, when the day is done

Repetitions of each text unfold within a series of harmonic variations structured similarly to Reich's You Are (Variations) (2004), amidst a texture of interlocking string motifs, piano and vibraphone accents and woodwind accompaniment.

Daniel Variations was commissioned by Daniel's father, Judea Pearl and the Daniel Pearl Foundation, along with the Barbican Centre, where it received its premiere in 2006 as part of the composer's 70th birthday retrospective.
