= Pendulum Music =

1968 composition by Steve Reich

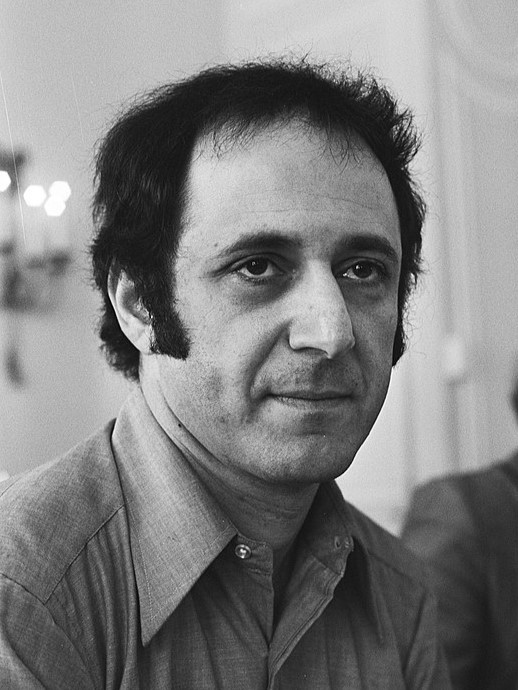
Steve Reich in 1976

Pendulum Music (For Microphones, Amplifiers Speakers and Performers) is the name of a work by Steve Reich, involving suspended microphones and speakers, creating phasing feedback tones. The piece was composed in August 1968 and revised in May 1973, and is an example of process music.

== Overview ==
Reich came up with the concept while working at the University of Colorado. He was swinging a live microphone in the style of the cowboy's lasso, and noting the produced feedback, he composed for an "orchestra" of microphones.

Three or more microphones are suspended above the speakers by means of a cable and stand. The microphones are pulled back, switched on, and released over the speaker, and gravity causes them to swing back and forth as pendula. As the microphone nears the speaker, a feedback tone is created. Different lengths of cable will swing at different speeds, creating an overlapping series of feedback squeals. The music created is thus the result of the process of the swinging microphones.

According to Reich, "The piece is ended sometime shortly after all mikes have come to rest and are feeding back a continuous tone by performers pulling the power cords of the amplifiers". He also added: "If it's done right, it's kind of funny".

Reich's 1974 book Writings About Music contains the hand-written (1973 revision) description of how to perform the piece.

Writings About Music contains a photo of a performance at the Whitney Museum of American Art on May 27, 1969. The performers there were Richard Serra, James Tenney, Bruce Nauman and Michael Snow.

== Notable recordings ==
Experimental rock group Sonic Youth recorded the piece on its 1999 album SYR4: Goodbye 20th Century. The Avant-Garde Ensemble recorded three different versions of "Pendulum Music". In 2014, composer Daniel Fishkin created a new transcription of the piece, in which, instead of using audio feedback, the feedback takes place in the domain of light, using solar cells and oscilloscopes instead of microphones and loudspeakers.

In 2012, Richard D James performed a version of the piece using lasers reflected off of giant Newton's cradles.
