= Tehillim (Reich) =

1981 composition by Steve Reich

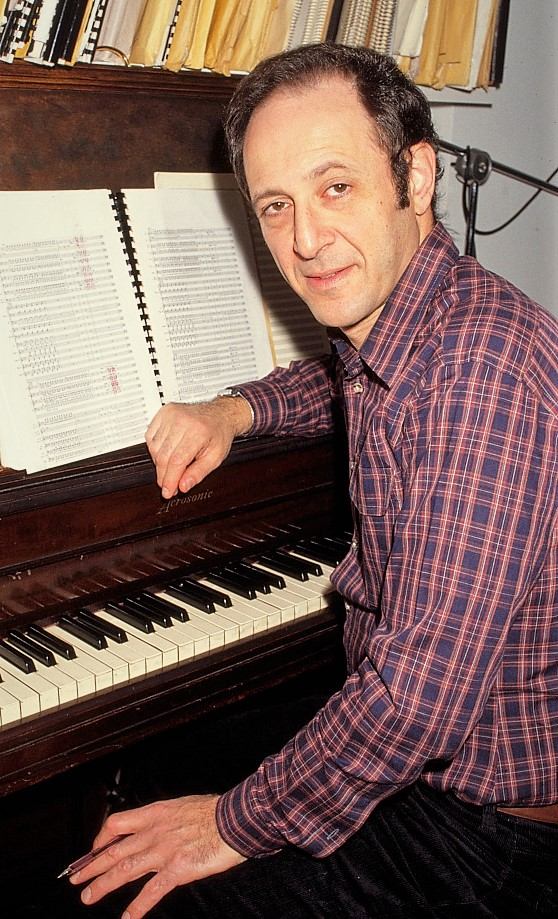
Steve Reich ca. 1982–84

Tehillim is a composition by American composer Steve Reich, written in 1981.

== Title ==
The title comes from the Hebrew word for "psalms", and the work is the first to reflect Reich's Jewish heritage. It is in four parts, marked fast, fast, slow, and fast.

Tehillim is the setting of Psalms 19:2–5 (19:1–4 in Christian translations); Psalm 34:13–15 (34:12–14); Psalm 18:26–27 (18:25–26); and finally Psalm 150:4–6. The four parts of the work are based on these four texts, respectively. "Literally translated [the word Tehillim] means 'praises'," writes Steve Reich in his composer's notes, "and it derives from the three letter Hebrew root ‘hey, lamed, lamed’ (hll) which is also the root of halleluyah."

== Instrumentation and the music ==
In its standard chamber version Tehillim is scored for four treble voices (one high soprano, two lyric sopranos and one alto), piccolo, flute, oboe, English horn, two clarinets, six percussion (playing 4 small tuned tambourines without jingles, clapping, maracas, marimba, vibraphone and crotales), two electronic organs, two violins, viola, cello and bass. The voices, winds and strings are amplified in performance. There is also a version for orchestra using full strings and winds, with only the voices amplified.

The first and longest movement is based on canons, while the second, performed without pause, utilizes a theme and variations structure. The third movement, the only slow movement, features call-and-response, and continues without pause into the finale, which recapitulates in turn the structures of the first three movements.

A typical performance takes about 30 minutes.

== Analysis ==
Tehillim was the first major composition by Reich to reference explicitly his new-found interest in his Jewish heritage, and his Judaism as such. However, although this is obviously central to the work, and although it would not be until 2004, with You Are (Variations), that Reich would again set Jewish scriptures to music, the real difference lies in the formal aspects of Tehillim.

Typically, Reich's music is characterised by a steady pulse and the repetition of a comparatively small amount of melodic material emanating from a clear tonal centre (a style of writing which is called 'minimalist'). Both aspects are certainly to be identified in Tehillim (the composition in no way marks a complete aesthetic break for Reich), for example in the quick, unchanging tempo of the first two parts, which are played one after another without a break, and the close four-part canons of the first and fourth parts. However, these aspects together constitute only the broad outlines of the work; how they are presented is markedly different from his early work.

These differences are a direct consequence of the need felt by the composer to, "set the text in accordance with its rhythm and meaning".

There is no fixed metre or metric pattern in Tehillim. The rhythm of the music comes directly from the rhythm of the Hebrew text. Secondly, the musical setting of lengthy 3-4 line texts results in the composition of extended melodies at that point atypical for Reich. "Though an entire melody may be repeated either as the subject of a canon or variation, this is actually closer to what one finds throughout the history of Western music". As such, this second aspect of extended melody contributes to the appearance of structures not without precedent in Western musical history.

"The use of extended melodies, imitative counterpoint, functional harmony and full orchestration may well suggest renewed interest in Classical, or more accurately Baroque, and earlier Western musical practice. The non-vibrato, non-operatic vocal production will also remind listeners a singing style derived from outside the tradition of 'Western art music'. However, the overall sound of Tehillim, and in particular, the intricately interlocking percussion writing which, together with the text, marks this music as unique by introducing a basic musical element that one does not find in earlier Western musical practice including the music of this century. Tehillim may thus be heard as traditional and new at the same time".

None of the writing is informed by the sound or structure (in spite of the composer's recent study of Hebrew cantillation) of Jewish music generally or any existing tradition for singing the Biblical text. Indeed, a major factor in Reich's choosing the Psalms was that, "the oral tradition for Psalm singing in the Western synagogues has been lost. This meant I was free to compose the melodies for Tehillim without a living oral tradition to imitate or ignore."
