= Six Pianos =

1973 composition by Steve Reich

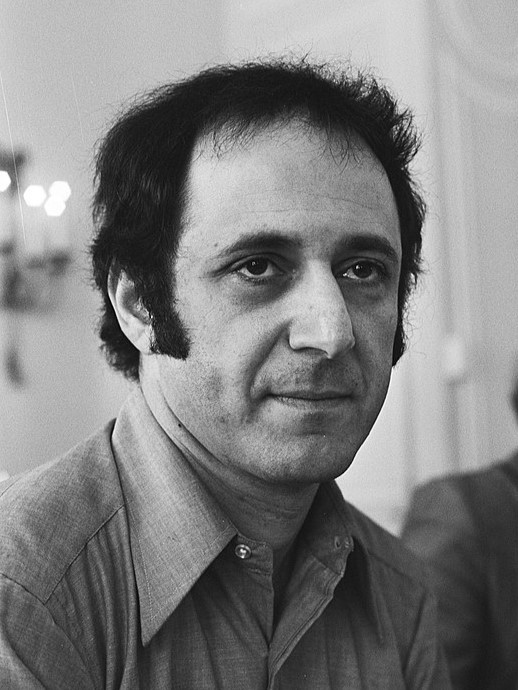
Steve Reich in 1976

Six Pianos is a minimalist piece for six pianos by the American composer Steve Reich. It was completed in March 1973. He also composed a variation for six marimbas, called Six Marimbas, in 1986. The world première performance of Six Pianos was in May 1973 at the John Weber Gallery in New York City. The European première took place in January the next year in Stuttgart, Germany.

Reich's idea was originally for a piece titled Piano Store that could be played on all the pianos in a piano store. A friend in New York gave him and his fellow musicians access to the Baldwin Piano and Organ Company's premises during evenings, where they could try out ideas. Reich eventually settled on an ensemble of six upright pianos in close proximity, which would allow very precise timing without being masked by the resonance of grand pianos.

== Structure ==
The piece begins with four pianists playing different notes to the same 8-beat rhythmic pattern. Then two more pianists begin to play the same pattern shifted two beats out of phase. (Phasing is a prominent technique in most of Steve Reich's work.) Different phase shifts of the same motifs fade in and out of the ever-changing musical texture for the duration of the piece. The piece also uses the additive technique of gradually building up parts by substituting notes for rests, and the opposite. Six Pianos is also notable by being one of Reich's only pieces in duple time.

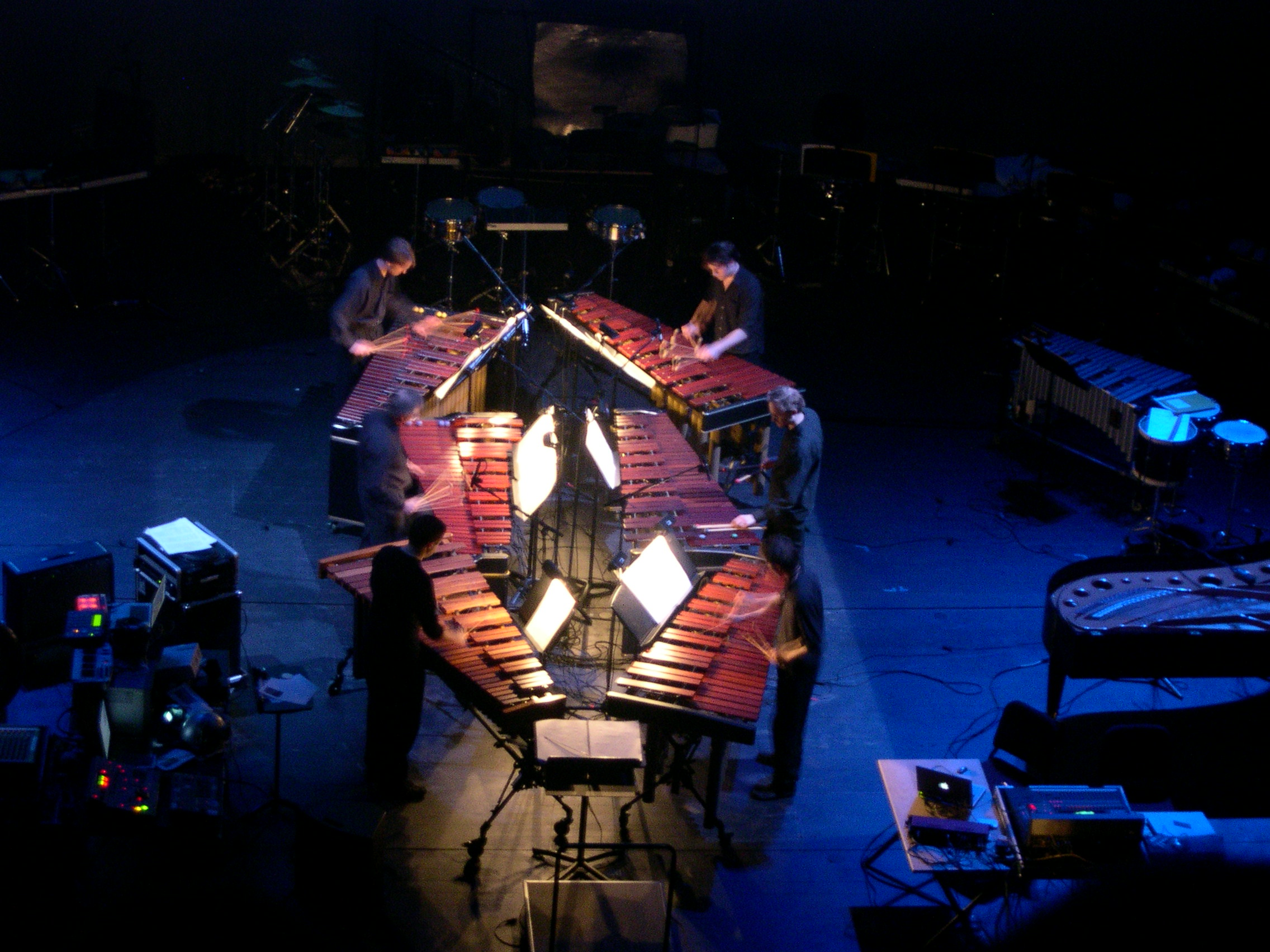
The London Sinfonietta performing Six Marimbas in 2005

Six Pianos has three sections, separated by relatively sudden changes of tonal center, though they all use the same seven pitch classes of the D major diatonic scale. The first section is in D major, with the tonality anchored in place by a persistent pattern of D and A in the bass. Then that pattern slowly fades out, leaving a B minor tonality which serves as a short transition to the second section in E Dorian. A sudden transition leads to the third section in B natural minor. Six Marimbas follows the same structure, but is transposed down by one semitone so that the piece opens in D flat major and concludes in B flat natural minor.

== Adapted versions ==
Six Marimbas Counterpoint is a version of Six Marimbas arranged by the Japanese percussionist Kuniko Kato in which one live marimba plays against five pre-recorded marimbas. A recorded version was included in her 2010 album of Reich pieces, Kuniko Plays Reich.

Piano Counterpoint is an arrangement of Six Pianos by the pianist Vincent Corver, following the format of Reich's Counterpoint series in which one live instrument plays against pre-recorded versions of the same instrument. This arrangement has four pre-recorded parts and one solo part, combining the two foreground melodic parts of Six Pianos. Piano Counterpoint's sonic difference from the original comes from the use of amplification and from the solo part in which some of the melodic phrases are an octave higher. Corver created this arrangement in 2011. Piano Counterpoint is performed by Corver himself on an album released by the London Steve Reich Ensemble in 2011 and by Vicky Chow (known for her role as pianist in the Bang on a Can All Stars) in an album released in 2014. Chow played the piece at a somewhat slower tempo to give a different feel to Corver's version.

Folkwang University of the Arts professor Mie Miki adapted the piece for accordions: the resulting Six Accordions premièred in Tokyo in 2010.

American DJ Kerri Chandler released a house-music track called Six Pianos that interpolates the Reich piece.

Susumu Yokota sampled this piece in his 2005 track Blue Sky and Yellow Sunflower from the album Symbol, where it serves as the rhythmic foundation of the song, exemplifying the influence of Reich's minimalist style on the ambient electronic genre of contemporary music.

== Recordings ==
The original version of the piece was recorded in Hamburg (Rahlstedt), Musikstudio 1, in January 1974. It was issued on LP in a box set with Drumming and Music for Mallet Instruments, Voices and Organ. It was later reissued as a single LP with Drumming (which occupies 4 sides of LPs) omitted. Both releases were on the Deutsche Grammophon label.

A sixteen-minute recording of Six Marimbas is available on Reich's 1986 album "Sextet - Six Marimbas"; this is also included in Reich's box set Works 1965–1995.
