= Come Out (Reich) =

1966 composition by Steve Reich

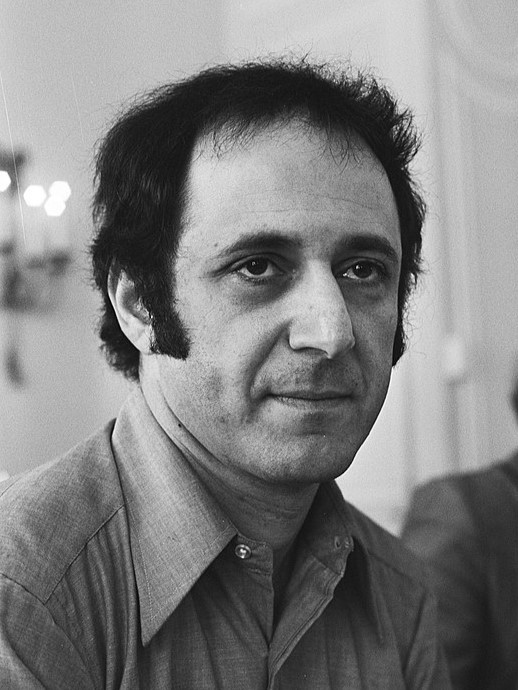
Steve Reich in 1976

Come Out is a 1966 tape piece by the American composer Steve Reich.

Civil rights activist Truman J. Nelson asked Reich to create a piece using recordings of voices for a benefit for the Harlem Six; Come Out was a byproduct of the collage's production. The Harlem Six were six black youths arrested for a murder of Margit Sugar, a Hungarian refugee, in Harlem in the weeks following the Little Fruit Stand Riot of 1964. Nelson agreed to give Reich creative freedom with the tapes. Come Out was constructed entirely from a loop of four seconds taken from the more than 70 hours of tapes Nelson presented.

Reich used the voice of Daniel Hamm, one of those involved in the riots but not responsible for the murder; he was nineteen at the time of the recording. At the beginning of the piece, he says, "I had to, like, open the bruise up, and let some of the bruise blood come out to show them", alluding to how he had punctured a bruise on his own body to convince police who had beaten him to allow him to receive medical aid. This marked the first time that a member of the Five-Percent Nation appeared on a published recording.

The full statement is heard three times. Next, Reich re-recorded the fragment "come out to show them" on two channels, which initially play in unison. They quickly slip out of sync to produce a phasing effect, which Reich had first used in his 1965 tape piece It's Gonna Rain and would later apply in acoustic works such as Piano Phase (1967). Gradually, the discrepancy widens and becomes an echo and, later, almost a canon. The two voices then split into four, looped continuously, and then eight, until the words are unintelligible. The listener is left with only the rhythmic and tonal patterns of the spoken words. Reich says in the liner notes of his album Early Works of using recorded speech as source material that "by not altering its pitch or timbre, one keeps the original emotional power that speech has while intensifying its melody and meaning through repetition and rhythm." The piece is an example of process music.

In 1967, Come Out was released on LP by Odyssey Records alongside electronic works by Richard Maxfield (Night Music) and Reich's former San Francisco Tape Music Center associate Pauline Oliveros (I of IV).

Come Out was one of several works by Reich used by the Belgian choreographer Anne Teresa De Keersmaeker as part of Fase (1982), which became a cornerstone of contemporary dance.

The piece was remixed by the Japanese DJ Ken Ishii for the 1999 album Reich Remixed.

== References in other recordings and media ==
- Captain Beefheart's song "Moonlight on Vermont," from Trout Mask Replica (1969), includes the phrase "come out to show them" repeated several times. Pamela Des Barres recalled the piece being played on repeat during the rehearsals for the Trout Mask Replica sessions. Mark Saucier's notes on "Moonlight on Vermont" reinterpret the phrase: "somewhere in this section he's clearly singing 'Come out to Sodom, come out to Sodom.'"
- Come Out was sampled at the beginning of the Madvillain song "America's Most Blunted".
- Part of the sampled quotation also appears in the song "The Caliphate" on the collaborative album Voir Dire by Earl Sweatshirt and the Alchemist.
- It also appears on the Unkle Bruise Blood remix of Tortoise's song "Djed."
- Camper Van Beethoven performed an abbreviated "cover version" of Come Out on their 2004 album New Roman Times.
- The quotation again appears at the beginning of the Maximillian Colby song "New Jello".
- A sample from the quotation is repeatedly looped on the D*Note track "D*Votion".
- A part of the quotation is sampled in the track "Rush" by Prometheus (Benji Vaughan) on his third studio album Spike.
- The track appears on Nicolas Jaar's Resident Advisor 500 Mix, which was recorded in December 2015 in Brooklyn, New York.
- In 2016, DJs Leon Vynehall and Ellen Allien both opened their respective entries in BBC Radio 1's Essential Mix series with a clip from the piece.
- Doug Gillard's "Come out and Show Me" from his album Parade On (2014), contains the eponymous lyrics as well as a reference to Reich's original using the title words in the background of the latter part of the song.
- JPEGMAFIA replicates the line at the beginning of the song "Polly".
- Slauson Malone replicates the line in the songs "My feet's hurt 'I was a fugitive but then I realized there was nowhere I could run to' (see page 110 and 113)" and "My feet's tired (see page 108)".
- The piece is used in the soundtrack of the film Diane.
- A small section is used in season 1, episode 7 of the TV show Devs.
