= Phase music =

Compositional technique

Example of rhythm phasing with sixteen parts. The first part plays the rhythm and the other parts play the same rhythm faster by 101%. 102%, 103%, ..., 115%. Played on harmonics: the first eight parts play the first eight harmonics, and the second eight parts play the same harmonics transposed down an octave.

Phase music is a form of music that uses phasing as a primary compositional process. It is an approach to musical composition that is often associated with minimal music, as it shares similar characteristics, but some commentators prefer to treat phase music as a separate category. Phasing is a compositional technique in which the same part (a repetitive phrase) is played on two musical instruments, in steady but not identical tempo. Thus, the two instruments gradually shift out of unison, creating first a slight echo as one instrument plays a little behind the other, then a doubling effect with each note heard twice, then a complex ringing effect, and eventually coming back through doubling and echo into unison.

Phasing is the rhythmic equivalent of cycling through the phase of two waveforms as in phasing. The tempi of the two instruments are almost identical, so that both parts are perceived as being in the same tempo: the changes only separate the parts gradually. In some cases, especially live performance where gradual separation is extremely difficult, phasing is accomplished by periodically inserting an extra note (or temporarily removing one) into the phrase of one of the two players playing the same repeated phrase, thus shifting the phase by a single beat at a time, rather than gradually.

Phasing was popularized by Steve Reich, who composed tape music where several copies of the same tape loop are played simultaneously on different machines. Over time, the slight differences in the speed of the different tape machines causes a flanging effect and then rhythmic separation to occur. For example, "Drumming" asks for percussionists to play in synchrony, with some gradually accelerating as others remain steady.

Other examples include Reich's Come Out and It's Gonna Rain. This technique was then extended to acoustic instruments in his Piano Phase, Reich's first attempt at applying the phasing technique to live performance, and later the change in phase was made immediate, rather than gradual, as in Reich's Clapping Music.

== Origins ==
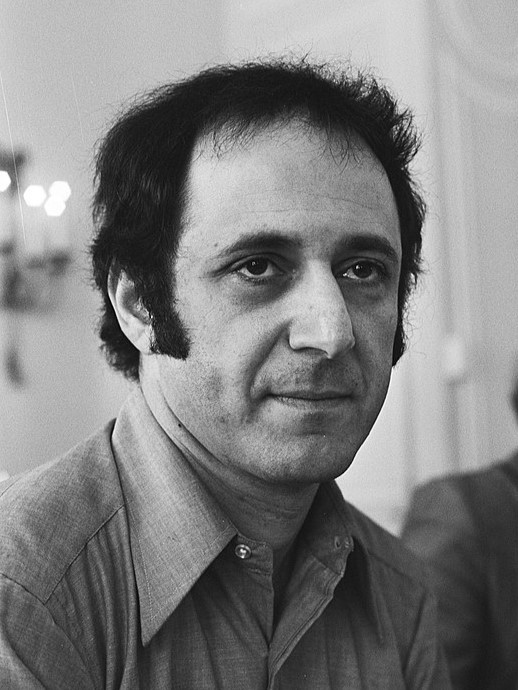
Phasing music is most closely associated with composer Steve Reich

In 1965, influenced by Terry Riley's use of tape looping and delay, the American composer Steve Reich started experimenting with looping techniques and accidentally discovered the potential of gradual phase shifting as a compositional resource.

In discussing the technicalities of what has been termed a "phase shifting process" Reich has stated that it is related to infinite canon or rounds in medieval music. The difference between phase music and traditional rounds, where two or more identical melodies are played with one starting after the other, is that the melodic phrases are generally short repeating patterns with the imitation being variable instead of fixed.

== Electroacoustic phase music ==
One early example of electroacoustic phase music is Earle Brown's Music for the Stadler Gallery (1964). The work featured four recordings of the same instrumental piece replayed continuously using four separate tape recorders. Over time, the recordings became increasingly out of phase with one another; the reported total duration of the work being 30 days.

This phase based technique was also exploited by Steve Reich in tape works composed between 1965 and 1966. Tape loops of phase-identical segments of recorded sound were played synchronously using multiple tape recorders and were then gradually moved out of phase by increasing or decreasing the playback speed of one of the players. The result of the recordings moving in and out of phase with each other was a transformative process where different timbres, beats, and harmonics were heard; some of which sounded markedly different from the original segment of recorded material. If the sound source had a natural cadence, the phasing created continuously shifting changes to the perceived rhythm as the material drifted in and out of phase. By using additional tracks and loops with identical source material the possibilities for creating a wider range of phasing relationships increases.

== Instrumental phase music ==
From 1967 Reich began exploring the gradual phase shifting technique in the context of composed music for instruments. The first of a series of works that would elaborate on this method was Piano Phase, composed in 1967.

Composed phase music features two or more instruments playing a repetitive phrase (part) in a steady but not identical tempo. In the case of gradual phase shifting, initially the tempi of the different instruments will be almost identical, so that both parts are perceived to be sounding in unison and at the same tempo. Over time the phrases gradually shift apart, creating first a slight echo as one instrument plays a little behind the other. This is followed by what sounds like a doubling with each note heard twice. Next, a complex ringing effect arises, after which the phrases eventually return, back through doubling, echo, and unison, to an in-phase position.

A number of the perceived changes in both phrasing and timbre that result from this phasing process are psychoacoustic in nature. According to Reich, "[t]he listener thus becomes aware of one pattern in the music which may open his ear to another, and another, all sounding simultaneously and in the ongoing overall texture of sounds." According to Paul Griffiths, there is a single objective process at work, one leading to a music that is "constantly susceptible to adventitious interpretations...the music is made by the ear."

== See also ==
- Chorus effect
- Experimental music
- Generative music
- La Monte Young
- Phase (waves)
- Phaser (effect)
- Polytempo
- Shepard tone
- Wave interference
