= It's Gonna Rain =

1965 composition by Steve Reich

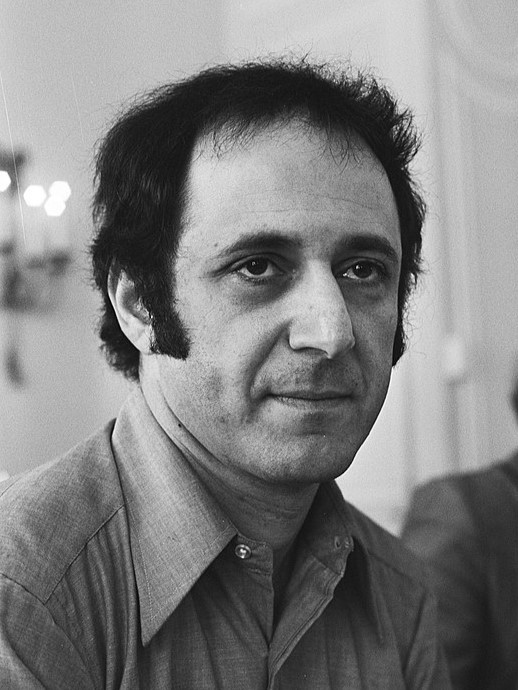
Steve Reich in 1976

It's Gonna Rain is a tape composition written by American composer Steve Reich in 1965. It lasts about 18 minutes. It was Reich's first major work and is considered a landmark in minimalism and process music.

== Analysis ==
It’s Gonna Rain… is a very heavy piece written in the shadow of the Cuban Missile Crisis, and the voice is a spectacularly moving, intense voice about the end of the world.

— Steve Reich

Around 1964, influenced by his work with Terry Riley on the composition In C and Riley's use of tape looping and delay systems, Reich started experimenting with these techniques as well. Up until January 1968, the full title of It's Gonna Rain was It's Gonna Rain, or meet Brother Walter in Union Square after listening to Terry Riley.

The source material of It's Gonna Rain consists entirely of a tape recording made in 1964 at San Francisco's Union Square. In the recording, a Pentecostal preacher, Brother Walter, rails about the end of the world, while accompanying background noises, including the sound of a pigeon taking flight, are heard. The piece opens with the story of Noah, and the phrase "It's Gonna Rain" is repeated and eventually looped throughout the first half of the piece.

For the recording, Reich used two normal Wollensak tape recorders with the same recording, originally attempting to align the phrase with itself at the halfway point (180 degrees). However, due to the imprecise technology in 1965, the two recordings fell out of sync, with one tape gradually falling ahead or behind the other due to minute differences in the machines, the length of the spliced tape loops, and playback speed. Reich decided to exploit what is known as phase shifting, where all possible repeated harmonies are explored before the two loops eventually get back in sync. The following year, Reich created another composition, Come Out, in which the phrase "come out to show them" is looped to create the same effect.

The work is in two parts of roughly equal length, the first using the "It's Gonna Rain" sample as mentioned above, the second using a separate section of the speech with short phrases cut together and the resultant pattern then phased as in the first part, but with additional tape delay to create a more processed sound.

During a lecture at the Long Now Foundation, electronic musician Brian Eno cited It's Gonna Rain as his first experience with minimalism and the genre that would come to be known as ambient music.
