= Music for Mallet Instruments, Voices and Organ =

1973 composition by Steve Reich

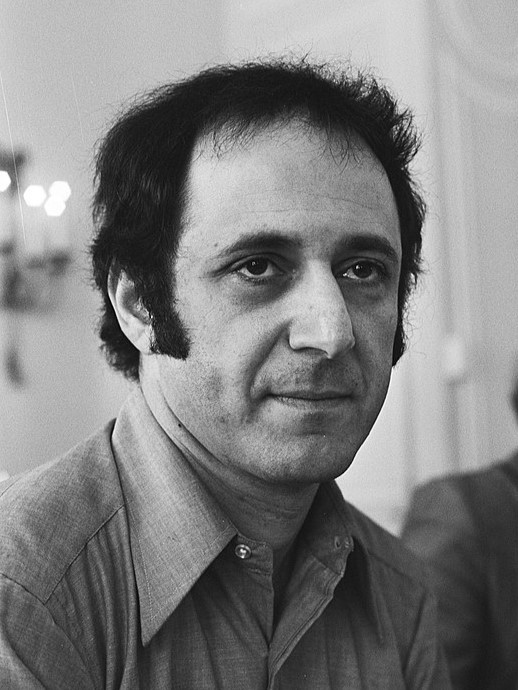
Steve Reich in 1976

Music for Mallet Instruments, Voices and Organ is a 1973 composition by American composer Steve Reich. The piece is scored for glockenspiels, marimbas, metallophone (vibraphone without resonator fans), women's voices, and organ, and runs about 17 minutes.

The piece is in four sections, played without a break, marked off by changes in key and meter:

1. F Dorian in 3/4
2. A♭ Dorian in 2/4
3. B♭ minor in 3/4
4. D♭ in 3/4.

The piece features two interrelated musical processes: the building up of a duplicate of a preexisting pattern played by the marimbas and the glockenspiels, and the augmenting (lengthening of the duration of notes) of repeated chord cadences of the women's voices and organ. The women's voices sing a simple vowel sound, ee, doubling upper notes of chords played by the organ.

The decision to double organ and women's voices was made by Reich after several months of experimentation. First he tried doubling four wind instruments with two men's and two women's voices. One attempt along this line was made with two bass clarinets and two clarinets; another involved bass trombone, trombone, flugelhorn, and trumpet. He found that the performers, both the wind players and the vocalists, had difficulty keeping in tune for long chords. Reich substituted organ for the wind instruments, and then eliminated the men's voices to avoid a sound that was "too heavy and slow moving."
