= Eight Lines =

1983 composition by Steve Reich

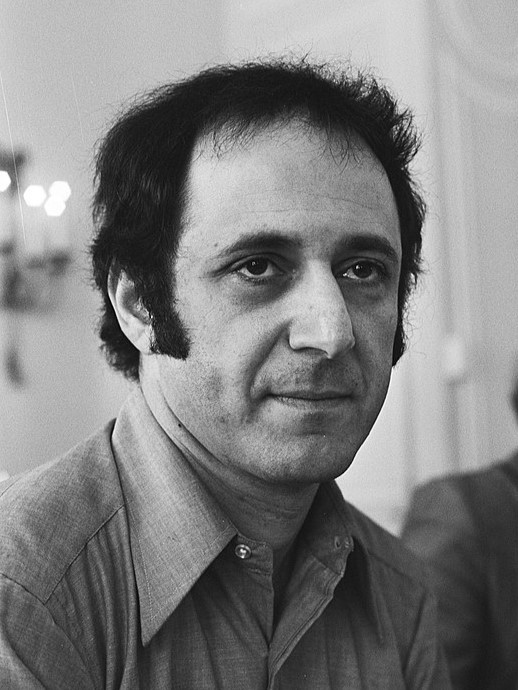
Steve Reich in 1976

Eight Lines is a work by American minimalist composer Steve Reich which was originally titled Octet.

== History ==
Under its original title, Octet, the work was commissioned by the Hessischer Rundfunk (Radio Frankfurt) and completed in April 1979. It was premiered at Radio Frankfurt on June 21, 1979, by members of the Netherlands Wind Ensemble, conducted by Reinbert de Leeuw (Reich 2002, 98). It was originally scored for string quartet, two pianos, and two woodwind players each playing clarinet, bass clarinet, and flute as well as piccolo.

Reich rescored it in 1983 to make performance easier, by adding a second string quartet, and retitling the work Eight Lines. The additional two violins solve "the difficulty of playing rather awkward double stops in tune," and the additional viola and cello "allow the rapid eighth-note patterns to be broken up between ... two players" to prevent fatigue (Reich 2002, 119). The wind parts were originally conceived for two clarinet players doubling both bass clarinet and flute as well as piccolo, though right from the world premiere in Frankfurt in 1979 ten players were used, dividing the wind parts among four musicians. The composer regarded this as a perfectly ordinary option, while pointing out "whether there are eight, nine, or ten performers, the piece is always musically an octet" (Reich 2002, 98).

In 1985, New York City Ballet's balletmaster Jerome Robbins made an eponymous ballet to this music (Kisselgoff 1985).

Reich made a new recording for his 1997 Works 1965–1995 boxed set.

== Analysis ==
The structure but not the sound of Jewish cantillation influenced the composition, particularly of the flute and piccolo melodies (Reich 2002, 113–14, 118).

The work is cast in a single movement about 15 to 18 minutes long, in a quick 5/4 meter. Its core is a syncopated piano ostinato, superimposed over transposed and shifted versions of itself. The woodwinds and strings play fragmented versions of these figures in unison with the pianos, as well as melodies of their own and slow drones in the background. The piece makes extensive use of imitative polyphony and incremental building of melodies.

The work is divided into five sections. The first and third share a similar texture of rapid piano, cello, and bass clarinet figures, while the second and fourth sections are marked by sustained tones in the cello. The fifth and final section combines these materials. The divisions between sections, however, involve smooth transitions with some overlapping in the parts. As a result, it is often difficult to tell just when one section ends and the next begins (Reich 2002, 99).
