= Galerie Kamel Mennour =

Contemporary art gallery in Paris, France

Coordinates: 48.8534°N 2.3399°E

Galerie Kamel Mennour is a contemporary art gallery in Paris, France, owned and directed by Kamel Mennour.

== History ==
The first space, 50sqm, was inaugurated on Rue Mazarine in 1999. Dedicated to contemporary photography, the gallery showed works of international artists, little known in France, like Larry Clark, Stephen Shore or Nobuyoshi Araki, alongside more established artists such as Pierre Molinier. Meanwhile, the gallery began to publish catalogs, accompanying these exhibitions. Today more than forty catalogs have been published by Kamel Mennour Editions.

The gallery gained reputation abroad by participating for the first time at Paris Photo in 1999, at the Foire Internationale d'Art Contemporain in 2000 and at Art Basel in 2003. Since, the gallery is present in most of the major international art fairs such as Art Basel, Foire Internationale d'Art Contemporain and Art Basel Miami Beach.

In 2003, the gallery began to diversify its programming by promoting young contemporary artists as well as established artists working in different media: Daniel Buren, Claude Lévêque, François Morellet and Martin Parr.

In September 2007, the gallery expanded into a new 400 m2 space of in the seventeenth century Hôtel particulier of Vieuville, located at 47 rue Saint-André-des-arts. Designed by architects Aldric Beckmann and Françoise N'Thépé, it was inaugurated with a solo exhibition by Daniel Buren. The initial space of the Rue Mazarine shows specific projects. In the following years the gallery continued to exhibit young emerging artists (Mohamed Bourouissa, Camille Henrot, Latifa Echakhch, Dario Escobar, Alicja Kwade) and established artists, which include among others Huang Yong Ping, Anish Kapoor, Tadashi Kawamata, Lee Ufan, Gina Pane and Martial Raysse.

Besides solo exhibitions, historical dialogues are held regularly (Daniel Buren and Alberto Giacometti in 2010, François Morellet and Kasimir Malevich in 2011), as well as group and thematic exhibitions, such as the exhibition of "Lux Perpetua" (2012) addressing the treatment of light from Delacroix to Ann Veronica Janssens, or “L’image pensée" (2013, curated by Donatien Grau), dedicated to the use of slideshows by contemporary artists.

Parallel to the gallery program, the gallery regularly collaborates with institutions to conduct significant off site projects, such as Arche 2009 by Huang Yong Ping in the Chapelle des Beaux-Arts de Paris, the 2011 and 2012 Monumenta exhibitions, respectively by Anish Kapoor and Daniel Buren at the Grand Palais. Other major collaborations were Claude Lévêque's solo presentation at the 2009 French pavilion at the Venice Biennale as well as Sigalit Landau's contribution to the Israeli pavilion in 2011 and later Camille Henrot's video Grosse Fatigue (2013), awarded with a Silver Lion for the most promising young artist.

In 2013, the gallery doubled its exhibition space by opening a second space on 6 rue du Pont de Lodi which allowed it to host monumental works under a vast glass roof, such as the inaugural exhibition by the Arte Povera artist Pier Paolo Calzolari.

In 2026, Mennour purchased Galerie Malingue and took over its 4,300-square-foot showroom at 26 Avenue Matignon in Paris’s Matignon district.

== Artists ==
Galerie Kamel Mennour represents several living artists, including:

- Neïl Beloufa (since 2018)
- Daniel Buren
- Pier Paolo Calzolari
- Latifa Echakhch (since 2021)
- Dario Escobar
- Michel François
- Alberto García-Alix
- Johan Grimonprez
- Camille Henrot
- Alfredo Jaar
- Ann Veronica Janssens
- Anish Kapoor
- Tadashi Kawamata
- Alicja Kwade
- Sigalit Landau
- Claude Lévêque
- Martin Parr
- Philippe Parreno
- Martial Raysse
- Zineb Sedira

In addition, the gallery manages various artist estates, including:

- Pinchas Burstein (since 2022)
- Yona Friedman
- François Morellet
- Gina Pane
- Huang Yong Ping

== Works by ==
- Nobuyoshi Araki
- Peter Beard
- Pierre Molinier
- Daido Moriyama
- Stephen Shore
- Ellen von Unwerth

== Mennour Institute ==
In 2023, the gallery launched the Mennour Institute, which promotes research and education in modern and contemporary art through doctoral fellowships, education programs and philanthropy.

== Publishing ==
- Daido Moriyama – Remix, Patrice Remy, éditions kamel mennour, Paris, 2012 - 2nd edition / 2004 - 1st edition, French & English, 300 pages, ISBN 978-2-914171-49-6
- Latifa Echakhch, Jean-Christophe Ammann, Latifa Echakhch, Annabelle Gugnon, Bernard Marcadé, éditions kamel mennour, Paris, 2012, French & English, 360 pages, ISBN 978-2-914171-46-5
- Martial Raysse - How the path is long, Martial Raysse, éditions kamel mennour, Paris, 2012, French - English, 40 pages, ISBN 978-2-914171-48-9
- Alfredo Jaar - The Sound of Silence, Okwui Enwezor, éditions kamel mennour, Paris, 2012, French & English, 256 pages, ISBN 978-2-914171-40-3
- Zineb Sedira - Beneath the Surface, Steven Bode, Coline Milliard, Hans Ulrich Obrist, Erik Verhagen, éditions kamel mennour, Paris, French & English, 248 pages, ISBN 978-2-914171-44-1
- Sigalit Landau - One man's floor is another man's feelings, Jean de Loisy, Hadas Maor, Chantal Pontbriand, Matanya Sack, Ilan Wizgan, éditions kamel mennour, Paris, 2011, French, English, Arabic, Hebrew, 248 pages, ISBN 978-2-914171-41-0
- Kazimir Malevitch & François Morellet / Carrément, éditions kamel mennour, Bernard Marcadé, Jean-Claude Marcadé, François Morellet, Serge Lemoine, éditions kamel mennour, Paris, 2011, French and English, 176 pages, ISBN 978-2-914171-42-7
- Huang Yong Ping, Wu Zei, Jérôme Alexandre, Marie-Claude Beaud, Marie-Laure Bernadac, Robert Calcagno, Fei Dawei, Jean de Loisy, Huang Yong Ping, Arnaud Laporte, Richard Leydier, Jean-Hubert Martin, Jessica Morgan, Gilles A. Tiberghien, éditions kamel mennour & Nouveau Musée National de Monaco, Paris, 2011, French, English and Chinese, 200 pages, ISBN 978-2-914171-39-7
- Johan Grimonprez, It's a poor sort of memory that only works backwards, Herman Asselberghs, Catherine Bernard, Jorge Luis Borges, Chris Darke, Jodi Dean, Thomas Elsaesser, Johan Grimonprez, Asad Ismi, Alvin Lu, Tom McCarthy, Florence Montagnon, Dany Nobus, Hans Ulrich Obrist, Vrääth Öhner, Mark Peranson, Alexander Provan, John Rumbiak, Simon Taylor, Eben Wood, Slavoj Žižek, Hatje Cantz (trade edition), 2011, English, 354 pages, ISBN 978-3-7757-3130-0
- Marie Bovo, Sitio, Marie Bovo, Régis Durand, Richard Leydier, éditions kamel mennour, Paris, 2010, French & English, 144 pages, ISBN 978-2-914171-38-0
- Daniel Buren & Alberto Giacometti, Œuvres contemporaines, 1964-1966, Daniel Buren, Véronique Wiesinger, Bernard Blistène, éditions kamel mennour, Paris, 2010, French / English (1st edition) & English / Arabic (2nd edition), 144 pages, ISBN 978-2-91417-136-6 (1st edition) / ISBN 978-2-914171-37-3 (2nd edition)
- Yona Friedman, Drawings & Models / Dessins & Maquettes, Yona Friedman, éditions kamel mennour, Les presses du réel, Paris, 2010, French & English, 1040 pages, ISBN 978-2-84066-406-2
- Tadashi Kawamata, Tree Huts, Jonathan Watkins, Martin Friedman, Guy Tortosa, éditions kamel mennour, Paris, 2010, French & English, 272 pages, ISBN 978-2-914171-34-2
- Pierre Molinier, Monographie, Jean-Luc Mercié éditions kamel mennour, Les presses du réel, Paris, 2010, French (1st edition) & English (2nd edition), 400 pages, ISBN 978-2-84066-338-6 (1st edition) & ISBN 978-2-84066-371-3 (2nd edition)
- Huang Yong Ping, Myths, Jean de Loisy, Gilles A. Tiberghien, Richard Leydier, éditions kamel mennour, Paris, 2009, French & English, 192 pages, ISBN 978-2-914171-33-5
- Alberto Garcia-Alix / Daido Moriyama, Far from home, éditions kamel mennour, Paris, 2008, French, English and Spanish, 144 pages, ISBN 978-2-914171-30-4
- Yona Friedman / Camille Henrot – Réception / Transmission, éditions kamel mennour, Paris Musées, Collections de Saint-Cyprien, Paris, 2007, English & French, 144 pages, ISBN 2-914171-29-3
- Marie Bovo - Nox, éditions kamel mennour, Paris Musées, Paris, 2007, English and French, 93 pages, ISBN 978-2-914171-28-1
- Alberto Garcia-Alix – No me sigas... estoy perdido, éditions kamel mennour, No Hay Penas, La Fabrica Editorial, Paris Musées, Paris, 2006, French, 171 pages, ISBN 978-84-96466-47-0
- Zineb Sedira - Saphir, éditions kamel mennour, The Photographers’ Gallery, Paris Musées, Paris, 2006, French & English, 88 pages, ISBN 2-914171-26-9
- Peter Granser – Coney Island, éditions kamel mennour, Paris Musées, Hatje Cantz Verlag et Les presses du réel, Paris, avril 2006, 100 pages, ISBN 2-914171-24-2
- Peter Granser – Alzheimer, éditions kamel mennour, Paris Musées and Les presses du réel, Paris, 2006, English & French, 95 pages, ISBN 2-914171-19-6
- Gary Lee Boas – New York Sex 1979-1985, éditions kamel mennour, Paris, décembre 2003, English & French, 240 pages, ISBN 2-914171-16-1
- Christine Macel, Danny Lyon – Forty Years éditions kamel mennour, Paris, 2003, English & French, 98 pages, ISBN 2-914171-14-5
- Annie Leibovitz, éditions kamel mennour, Paris, 2001, English & French, 46 pages, ISBN 978-2-914171-80-9
- Objectif Picasso, éditions kamel mennour, Paris, 2001, 162 pages, ISBN 2-914171-05-6
