= Calcagno =

Calcagno is an Italian surname. Notable people with the surname include:

- Domenico Calcagno (born 1943), Italian cardinal
- Eric Calcagno (born 1967), Argentine sociologist, journalist, diplomat and politician
- Fortunato Calcagno (1900–1966), Italian lawyer, politician and officer
- Francesco Calcagno (1528–1550), Franciscan friar
- Giuseppa Bolognara Calcagno (1826–1884), Italian revolutionary
- Lawrence Calcagno (1913–1993), American painter
- Raimundo Calcagno (1906–1982), Argentine film critic, journalist and screenwriter
- Robert Calcagno (born 1960), Monegasque politician
- Umberto Calcagno (born 1970), Italian footballer

== See also ==
- Calcagno (cheese)
