= Huang Yong Ping =

French artist

Huáng Yǒng Pīng (Chinese: 黄永砯; February 18, 1954 – October 20, 2019) was a Chinese-French contemporary artist, considered one of the most influential Chinese avant-garde artists of his time. Born in Xiamen, Fujian Province, he became known for provocative and experimental works that often incorporated cross-cultural critique, and the questioning of political and traditional normalities.

Huang was one of the earliest contemporary Chinese artists to consider art as strategy. As a self-taught student, some of his earliest artistic inspirations came from Joseph Beuys, John Cage, and Marcel Duchamp. He later graduated from art school in Hangzhou in 1982, and formed Xiamen Dada (廈門達達) in 1986. At the age of 35 in 1989, Huang traveled to Paris to partake in the exhibition Magiciens de la terre, later immigrated to France where he lived until his death.

As many of his pieces are very large, they are not suitable for auction.

Huang was represented by Gladstone Gallery in New York, Kamel Mennour in Paris, and Tang Contemporary in Beijing. He died of illness in Paris at the age of 65 on 20 October 2019.

== Early life and education ==
Huáng Yǒng Pīng was born in Xiamen in 1954. He was initially self-taught, then later graduated from art school in Hangzhou in 1982.

== Early career ==
Huang Yong Ping's early work can be divided into four periods: anti-artistic affectation (fan jiaoshi zhuyi), anti-self-expression (fan ziwo biaoxian he xingshi zhuyi), anti-art (fan yishu), and anti-history (fanyishushi).[citation needed]

In 1986, Huang co-founded Xiamen Dada (廈門達達) with Zha Lixiong, Liu Yiling, Lin Chun, and Jiao Yaoming, a radical avant-garde group influenced by postmodernist ideas. The group often challenged traditional notions of art; they famously burned their own works in protest, with Huang stating, “Artwork to artist is like opium to men. Until art is destroyed, life is never peaceful.” Following this act, Xiamen Dada refrained from further public exhibitions.

Between 1985 and 1988, Huang created the Roulette-Series, a set of three projects involving portable roulettes with six turntables. In these works, he explored chance and non-subjective creation, letting dice, roulette wheels, or other apparatuses determine elements such as color and composition. Huang viewed this process as reflecting the inevitability of destiny, where accident and chance were inseparable. He described his method as involving “a deferring process,” in which external forces influenced the final artwork. Influenced by Marcel Duchamp, Huang sought to eliminate aesthetic taste and embrace spontaneity. He also drew on Ludwig Wittgenstein’s theories of ontology and representation, categorizing art in three ways: as a process of art (“work of art is bigger than the thought”), as conceptual art (“the thought is bigger than the work of art”), and through the “Eastern Spirit,” reflecting Taoist ideas.

Another significant project was A Concise History of Modern Art after Two Minutes in the Washing Machine, in which Huang placed two art history textbooks—one by Chinese historian Wang Bomin and another by English historian Herbert Read—into a washing machine for two minutes, producing a pile of pulp displayed on a wooden box. Huang described the work as an attempt to dissolve the divide between tradition and modernity, East and West. A related performance, A “Book Washing” Project, preceded this work by three years. In that piece, Huang washed all the books from his personal library, applied the resulting pulp to the wall, and reflected similar concepts of anti-art and anti-history.

== Later career after leaving China, 1989-2019 ==
After the Tiananmen Square massacre in 1989, while Huang was in Paris for the Magiciens de la terre exhibition, he decided not to return to China. His works subsequently changed dramatically and focused prominently on Taoist and Buddhist philosophies. He suddenly was immersed in western ways.

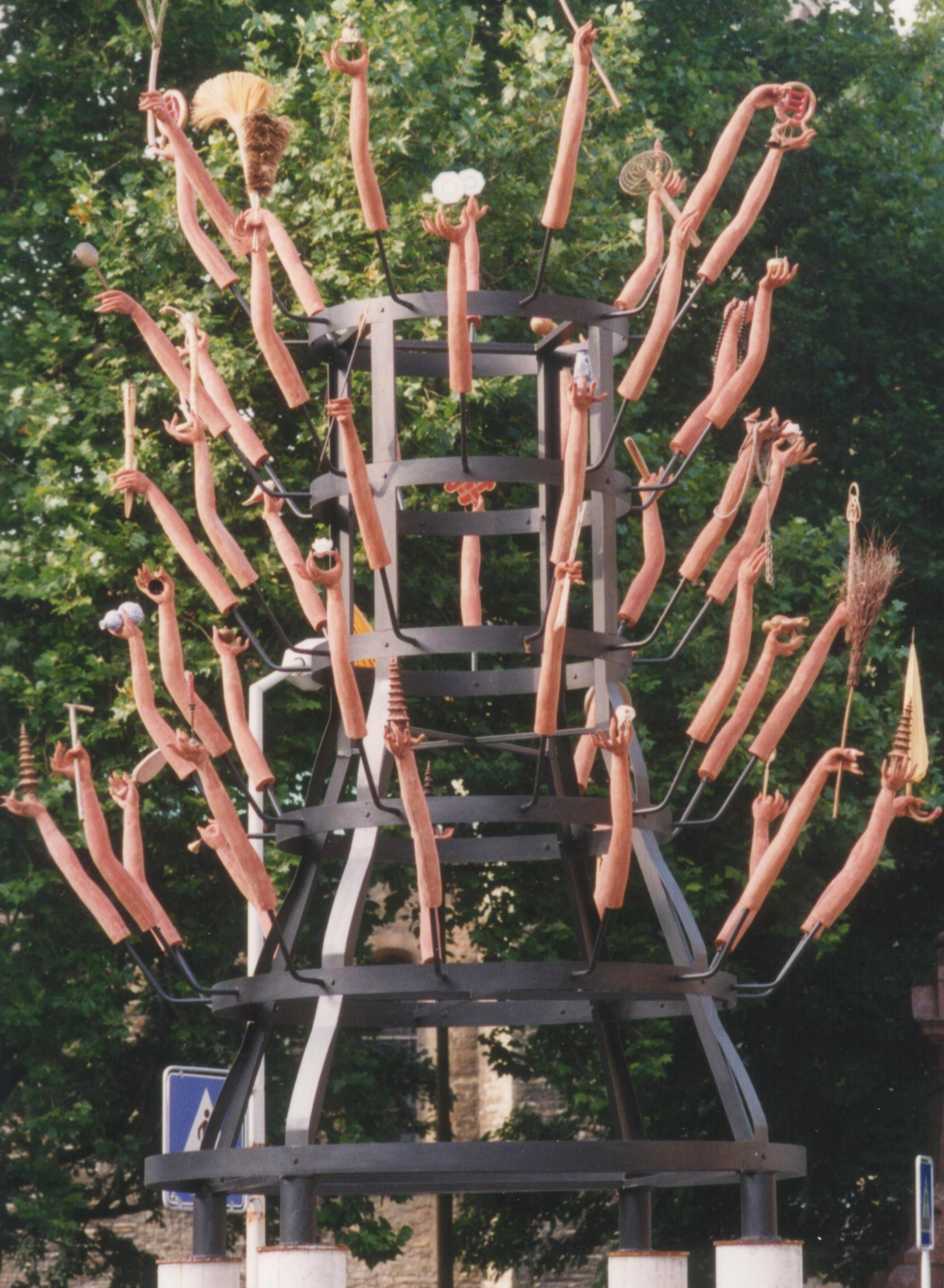
100 Arms of Guan-yin

In 1996, Huang participated in Manifesta, the European Biennial of Contemporary Art in Rotterdam, and in 1997, the "Skulptur.Projekte" in Münster, Germany with his sculpture "100 Arms of Guan-yin". The Guanyin figure is associated with Buddhism and has multiple arms. Huang Yong Ping interprets this famous deity through his own 100 Arms of Guan-in by placing mannequin arms holding various objects on a metal structure which is itself an enlarged version of Marcel Duchamp's 1914 readymade Bottle Rack.

In 1999, as he became a citizen of France, Huang represented France in the Venice Biennale. In 2016, his piece "Empires" was selected for the Monumenta biennial exposition at the Grand Palais in Paris.

From October 16, 2005 through January 15, 2006 the House of Oracles Retrospective on Huang's work was shown at the Walker Art Center, at the Massachusetts Museum of Contemporary Art from March 18, 2006 to February 25, 2007, at the Vancouver Art Gallery from April 5 to September 16, 2007, and Ullens Center for Contemporary Art in Beijing from March 22 to June 8, 2008. The program described Huang's work as "drawing on the legacies of Joseph Beuys, Arte Povera, and John Cage as well as traditional Chinese art and philosophy" and juxtaposing traditional objects or iconic images with modern references. The retrosüpective featured more than forty works starting from his first exhibition Magicians of Earth (1989) up until then, showing the most significant ones of the past two decades, including Bat Project II (2002), The Nightmare of King George V (2002) and Python (2000). His art pieces showed portray historical events and the influences of political powers. The Nightmare of King George V portrays a 1911 hunting excursion that King George V went on to poach game in the juggle. Bat Project II historical background was Huang Yong Ping was going to recreate an exact replica of the U.S spy plane that crashed into a Chinese fighter, leading to controversy with in politics.

Renowned curator, Fei Dawei said: "This first retrospective of Huang Yongping originated at the Walker Art Centre in the United States. It was shown at Mass Moca, the biggest contemporary museum in America and then Vancouver Art Gallery, Canada, before traveling to its final venue, UCCA in Beijing. And even before the inauguration of UCCA, I've decided to put on this exhibition because as a Chinese Museum, we feel obliged to introduce the best Chinese artists. This is of great importance for the artist, as well as for the audiences in contemporary art and especially, for UCCA's image, as an institution in the art world."

In 2008, Huang's work was on display at the Astrup Fearnley museum of modern art in Oslo, Norway, his first solo show in Norway.

For his first UK solo show in The Curve, Barbican Art Gallery, London from 25 June-21 September 2008 he created an installation that explored the imperial history between Britain and China in the 19th century, focusing on the Opium Wars. The exhibition took its title Frolic from the name of a ship built to transport goods between British India, China and Great Britain.

In 2012, Huang's serpent d'océan, a monumental sculpture depicting the skeleton of a giant sea serpent, was installed in Saint-Brevin-les-Pins.

== Controversies ==
Some of Huang's works sparked debate, including:

Bat Project II (2002) involved taxidermy bats and faced removal by Chinese authorities prior to exhibition.

Theatre of the World (2008) at the Vancouver Art Gallery drew criticism from animal rights groups for containing live insects in enclosed enclosures.

== Personal life and death ==
Huang incorporated many different Chinese philosophies into his works, like Chan Buddhism, Taoism, some western philosophies and Dada, which led to the formation of the Xiamen Dada group. There are many similarities between Chan Buddhism and Dada as the common phrase suggests, “Chan is Dada, Dada is Chan." Both Chan and Dada are direct and reflective about aesthetic importance and the impossible reality of reality. However, Chan Buddhism and Taoism are constantly changing, and since Dada is Chan and vice versa, this should be the case for Dada. However, they are opposed to adding more movements making it a paradox and essential having this idea work against Dada's main ideas. The use of these philosophies are an example of “cross-cultural exchange” He died in Paris in 2019.

== Selected solo shows ==
2016

- "Monumenta," Grand Palais, Paris;
- "Wolfgang Hahn Prize,” Museum Ludwig, Cologne, Germany;
- “Bâton Serpent III: Spur Track to the Left,” Power Station of Art, Shanghai.

2015

- “Huang Yong Ping: Bâton Serpent II,” Red Brick Art Museum, Beijing

2014

- “Les Mues,” HAB Galerie – Hangar à Bananes, Nantes, France;
- “Huang Yong Ping: Bâton Serpent,” Maxxi, Rome.

2013

- “Amoy/Xiamen,” Museum of Contemporary Art, Lyon, France;
- “Abbottabad,” Hôtel de Gallifet, Aix-en-Provence, France.

2012

- “Circus,” Gladstone Gallery, New York;
- “Bugarach,” Galerie Kamel Mennour, Paris;
- “Lille 3000, Fantastic,” Musée de l’Hospice Comtesse, Lille, France.

2011

- “Huang Yong Ping,” Nottingham Contemporary, Nottingham, England.

2010

- “Huang Yong Ping,” Musée Océanographique de Monaco, Monte Carlo, Monaco.

2009

- "Huang Yong Ping: Arche 2009,” Ecole Nationale Supérieure des Beaux-Arts, Paris;
- “Huang Yong Ping: Tower Snake,” Gladstone Gallery, New York;
- “Huang Yong Ping: Caverne,” Kamel Mennour, Paris.

2008

- House of Oracles: A Huang Yong Ping Retrospective, UCCA in Beijing

2007

- “Huang Yong Ping,” Bernier and Eliades, Athens;
- “Huang Yong Ping: From C to P,” Gladstone Gallery, New York.

2006

- “Pantheon,” Centre International d'art et du Paysage de l'ile de Vassiviere, l’ile de Vassiviere, France;
- “Les Mains de Bouddha,” Galerie Anne de Villepoix, Paris.

2005

- House of Oracles, Walker Art Center, Minneapolis, U.S.A

2003

- “Huang Yong Ping,” Massachusetts Museum of Contemporary Art, North Adams, Massachusetts;
- “Huang Yong Ping,” Beacon Project Space, Beacon, New York;
- “Huang Yong Ping,” Fundacion NMAC, Cadiz, Spain;
- “Huang Yong Ping,” Groningen, The Netherlands;
- “Huang Yong Ping,” Musée Dominique Vivant Denon, Chalon-sur-Saône, France.

2002

- Xian Wu, Art & Public, Geneva, Switzerland
- "Om Mani Padme Hum," Barbara Gladstone Gallery, New York, U.S.A.

2000

- "Taigong fishing, Willing to Bite the Bait," Jack Tilton Gallery, New York, U.S.A.

1999

- One man, nine animals, part of Venice Biennale, installed in château de Caen since 2007

== Bibliography ==
- Memorandum: Bat Project I, II, III, 2001-2004. Köln: Buchhandlung Walther König and Museum Ludwig, 2016.
- Wu Zei Huang Yong Ping , Jérôme Alexandre, Marie-Claude Beaud, Marie-Laure Bernadac, Robert Calcagno, Fei Dawei, Jean de Loisy, Huang Yong Ping, Arnaud Laporte, Richard Leydier, Jean-Hubert Martin, Jessica Morgan, Gilles A. Tiberghien, kamel mennour & Nouveau Musée National de Monaco, 2011.
- Myths Huang Yong Ping , Jean de Loisy, Gilles A. Tiberghien, Richard Leydier, kamel mennour, 2009.
- House of Oracles: a Huang Yong Ping Retrospective , Doryun Chong, Hou Hanru, Huang Yong Ping and Philippe Vergne, Walker Art Center, 2005.
- Magiciens de la terre, Jean-Hubert Martin, Centre Georges Pompidou, 1989.

== Decorations ==
- Officer of the Order of Arts and Letters (2015)
