= Pembo =

Pembo may refer to the following places:

- Pembo, the Breton name for the Paimbœuf commune in France
- Pembo, barangay in the city of Taguig in the Philippines
