= Les Arts décoratifs =

Group of French museums

Coordinates: 48°51′47″N 2°20′0″E

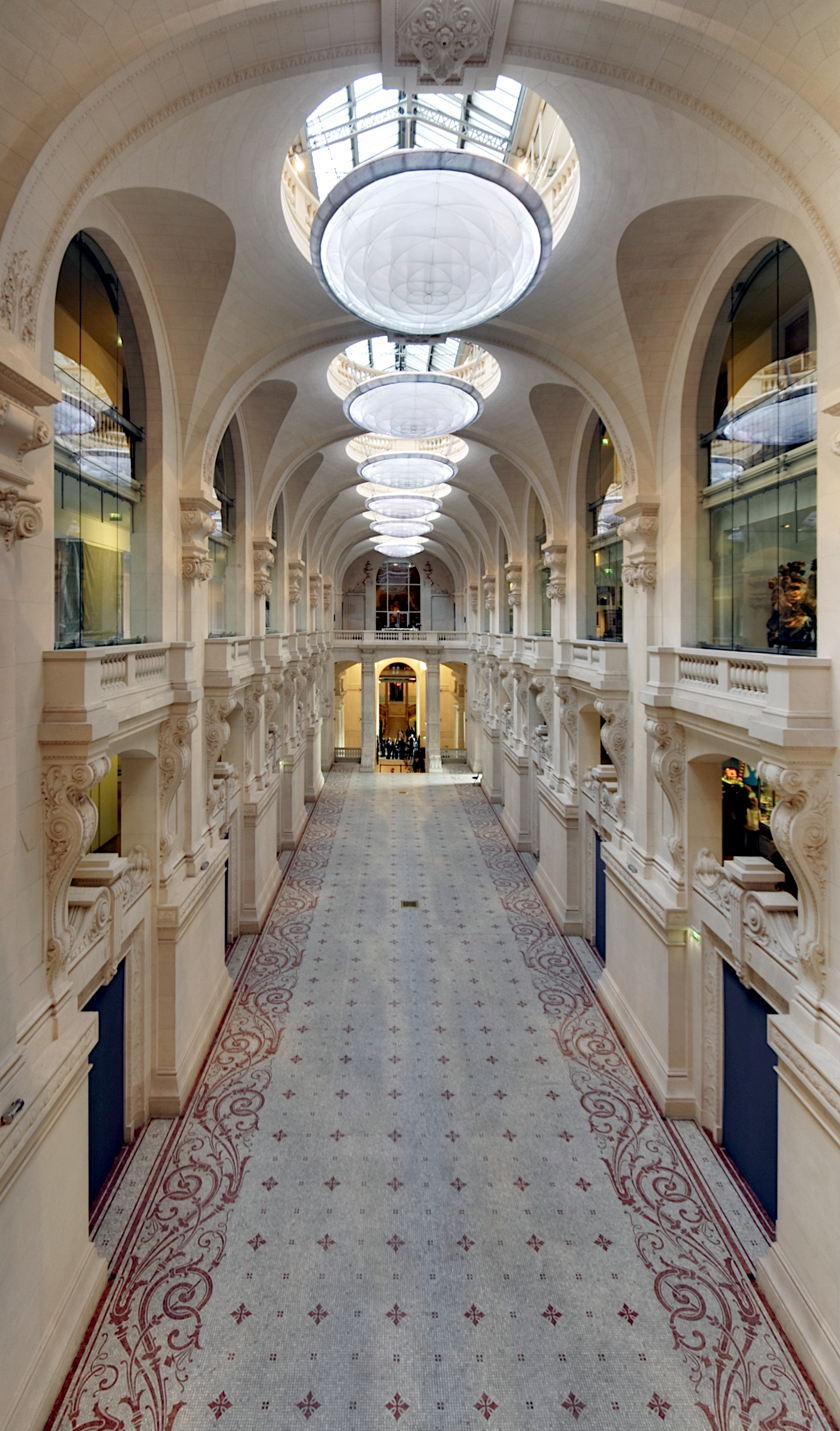
Inside the museum

Les Arts décoratifs is a private, non-profit organization which manages museums of decorative arts located in Paris, France.

The first museum dates to 1882, when collectors with an interest in the applied arts formed the initial organization. For many years it was known as the Union centrale des arts décoratifs (UCAD), but in December 2004 it was renamed “Les Arts décoratifs”. Pamela Golbin is the chief curator of fashion and textiles at Les Arts décoratifs.

== Sites and collection ==
The museums currently occupy three sites, with the Ateliers du Carrousel (art and craft workshops) active at all three:

- 107 rue de Rivoli, in the Louvre's Rohan and Marsan wings — Musée des Arts Décoratifs
- 63 rue de Monceau — the Musée Nissim de Camondo in the Hôtel Camondo.
- 266 boulevard Raspail — École Camondo, school of design and interior architecture.

As of 2006, its collections included approximate 357,100 works as follows:

- Musée des Arts décoratifs — 150,000 works from medieval furniture to contemporary design, including Empire, Art Nouveau and Art Deco styles; large collections of jewelry, toys, wallpaper, gold work, ceramics, glass, drawings and an Islamic and Oriental collection.
- Musée de la Publicité — 100,000 historical and contemporary posters as well as over 20,000 French and foreign advertising films from the 1930s to the present day; radio commercials, promotional objects, packaging, and more from the formerly separate Musée de la Publicité.
- Musée de la Mode et du textile — 86,000 costumes, accessories, and textiles from Copts to the present day; from the formerly separate Musée de la mode et du textile.
- Musée Nissim de Camondo — 1,100 works; one of the finest sets of French furniture and objets d'art from the second half of the 18th century.
- In May 2007, Les Arts décoratifs exhibited Love & Art Children's Foundation's "L'Enfant et l'Art" collection. This art collection was created by children afflicted with cancer at the Hospital Armand Trousseau in sterilized rooms and by children in remission in Les Ateliers du Carrousel under the guidance of Love & Art's founder, artist Alécia de Menezes Seidler.

== Notable people ==
- Marie-Claude Beaud, Les Arts décoratifs director, 1997–2000
