= Martin Ney =

German serial killer (born 1970)

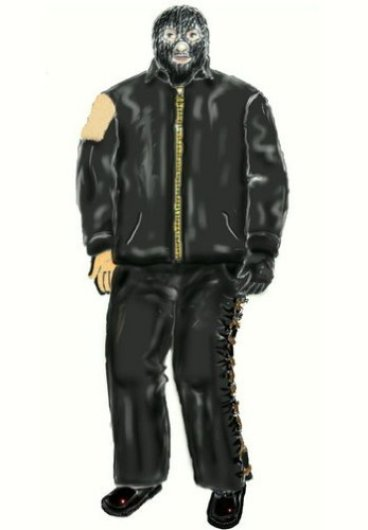
- Sketch of Ney
- Born: 12 December 1970 (age 55); Bremen, West Germany (today Germany)
- Other names: Maskenmann (Masked Man); Schwarzer Mann (Black Man)
- Penalty: Life imprisonment

Details
- Victims: 4
- Span of crimes: 1992–2004
- Country: Germany, France
- State: Lower Saxony
- Date apprehended: 15 April 2011

Martin Ney (born 12 December 1970) is a German convicted serial killer and child sex offender.

Between 1992 and 2004, Ney murdered three boys in northern Germany. During the same timeframe, Ney was linked to the sexual abuse of 45 others during burglaries and while employed as a child caregiver. Ney wore a mask and dark clothing when committing the majority the crimes, leading him to be known as the Masked Man (German: Maskenmann) or the Black Man (Schwarzer Mann). He carried out his offences in school grounds and private homes.

After his arrest on 15 April 2011, Ney confessed to the murders of Dennis Klein, Stefan Jahr and Dennis Rostel. On 27 February 2012, he was sentenced to life imprisonment by the Stade district court for three murders and 20 cases of sexual assaults. The court noted particular severity of guilt, making it less likely for Ney to obtain parole after serving a minimum of 15 years under German law.

Ney was also suspected of the murders of Jonathan Coulom in Brittany and Nicky Verstappen in the Netherlands. Verstappen's death has since been solved and unlinked to Ney, though he remained a suspect in the Coulom case. In 2021, Ney was extradited to Nantes, France to face charges for Coulom's murder. On June 4, 2026, Martin Ney was found guilty and sentenced to life in prison for the 2004 murder of Jonathan Coulom.

== Crimes ==
In 1992, a number of acts of sexual assaults were carried out against boys in Lower Saxony. The attacker always attacked at night, and was described as tall, strong, and wearing a mask. The attacks were carried out in boarding schools, school camps and youth homes. From 1994 on, Ney began breaking into single-family homes.

Between 1992 and 2004 Ney murdered three boys in Germany and either sexually abused or attempted to abuse 45 others. He also has been convicted of the murder of Jonathan Coulom in Loire-Atlantique, France.

=== School home attacks ===
==== Children's home in Hepstedt ====
On 3 March 1992, a student discovered a masked man in an empty dormitory of a children's home in Hepstedt. The man fled shortly afterwards through a patio door. A few days later, presumably the same man tried to sexually abuse an 11-year-old boy but fled when the boy began to scream. Between April and June 1992, a masked man was seen twice by students, and one night in August of the same year, he woke several children up by touching them inappropriately. In September, a stranger approached a boy's bed and asked him to undress. On an October night, a masked man spoke to five children, of which he then sexually abused three. After these incidents, a motion detector was installed in the school camp and the door locking system was renewed.

==== Schullandheim Badenstadt ====
In March 1992, a series of similar incidents took place in Schullandheim Badenstadt in Zeven, when a stranger tried to sexually abuse a 13-year-old at night. In August of the same year, presumably the same perpetrator snuck into a toilet occupied by a ten-year-old boy. In September 1992, the man touched a nine-year-old inappropriately, after he had carried him from his bed into an adjoining room. In May 1994, the alleged serial offender abused an 11-year-old and almost exactly one year later, he similarly abused a ten-year-old boy. In October 1995, he tried to touch a 13-year-old, but fled when he sat down close to his classmates. In June 1998, he struck in Badenstadt for the last time, when he tried to touch two boys, both of whom resisted his advances.

==== Schullandheim Wulsbüttel – Murder of Dennis Klein (2001) ====
In June 1995, an unknown man abused a ten-year-old exchange student in Wulsbüttel and fled through a room window. In July 1999, the man awoke an eight-year-old boy, took him to the house basement and sexually abused him. On 5 September 2001, nine-year-old Dennis Klein disappeared from his room at night. A mushroom picker found the boy's corpse 14 days later in dense shrubbery on a forest road between Kirchtimke and Hepstedt.

==== Other crimes in school homes – Murders of Stefan Jahr (1992) and Jonathan Coulom (2004) ====
In March 1992, a teacher in the hallway of the Schullandheim Cluvenhagen saw a man carrying a drowsy boy who did not resist. When the offender noticed the teacher, he fled. In the early hours of 31 March 1992, 13-year-old Stefan Jahr disappeared from a boarding school in Scheeßel. Five weeks later, his body was found buried in the Verden dunes with his hands tied behind his back. On 7 April 2004, 11-year-old Jonathan Coulom disappeared from a school home in Saint-Brevin-les-Pins in Brittany. In May, his undressed and handcuffed body, which was attached to a concrete block, was found in a pond about 30 kilometres (19 mi) away. Ney is said to have been close to the scene of the crime in May 2004.

==== Tent camp attacks – Murder of Dennis Rostel (1995) ====
This crime spree began in August 1992, when a masked offender sexually abused a nine-year-old and another child in a camp near Selker Noor. In July 1994, the perpetrator entered two tents, one after another, in a camp in Otterndorf and awoke seven boys aged between eight and nine, whom he touched inappropriately. At the end of August 1994, a 13-year-old boy woke up in the Selker Noor camp when a masked man began touching him. After about ten minutes, the man fled. Two days later, the man touched another 13-year-old in Selker Noor. During the night of 24 July 1995, eight-year-old Dennis Rostel disappeared from the camp. Two weeks later, German tourists found his body buried in a sand dune near Vinderup in Denmark.

==== Family house attacks ====
In April 1994, a masked offender broke into several single-family houses in the Bremen area, especially in the Horn-Lehe district, and abused three boys. Though the perpetrator's approach and detail differed from his previous offenses, investigators believed that all of the crimes had been committed by the same person. Despite the insistence of parents, the police did not issue a public warning.

=== Chronological overview of the acts ===
The list includes the crimes that were attributed to "the masked man" before Ney's arrest. The investigations following his arrest gave indications of further instances of abuse. Ney has denied his involvement in some of the offenses and the police have therefore been unable to conclusively prove his involvement in all cases.

Date	Crime scene	Offense	Comment
March 1992	Children's home Hepstedt	Trespassing	Offender was discovered and escaped unrecognized
March 1992	Children's home Hepstedt	Attempted abuse	Victims resisted
March 1992	Schullandheim Badenstedt	Attempted abuse	
March 1992	Schullandheim Cluvenhagen	Attempted abuse	Perpetrator was discovered, seized the act and escaped unrecognized
March 1992	Boarding school Scheeßel	Murder	Murder of Stefan Jahr; corpse was discovered on 3 May 1992
August 1992	Children's home Hepstedt	Multiple abuses	
August 1992	Schullandheim Badenstedt	Abuse	
August 1992	Tent Camp Selker Noor	Abuse	
September 1992	Schullandheim Badenstedt	Abuse	
September 1992	Children's home Hepstedt	Abuse	
October 1992	Children's home Hepstedt	Multiple abuses	
May 1994	Schullandheim Badenstedt	Abuse	
July 1994	Tent Camp Otterndorf	Multiple abuses	
August 1994	Tent Camp Selker Noor	Abuse	
August 1994	Tent Camp Selker Noor	Abuse	
April 1995	Hostel Bathrooms	Abuse	
May 1995	Schullandheim Badenstedt	Abuse	
June 1995	Schullandheim Wulsbüttel	Abuse	
July 1995	Tent Camp Selker Noor	Murder	Murder of Dennis Rostel; body was discovered on 8 August 1995.
October 1995	Schullandheim Badenstedt	Attempted abuse	Victims resisted
June 1998	Schullandheim Badenstedt	Attempted multiple abuses	Victims resisted
July 1999	Schullandheim Wulsbüttel	Abuse	
September 2001	Schullandheim Wulsbüttel	Murder	Murder of Dennis Klein; body was found on 19 September 2001
April 2004	Schullandheim Saint-Brévin-les-Pins, FR	Murder	Murder of Jonathan Coulom; corpse was found on 19 May 2004

== Investigation ==
In connection to the murder of Dennis Klein, a special commission was formed by the Verden an der Aller police (nicknamed SoKo "Dennis"). The special commission aimed to fit the offenses into a narrower context before assigning them to an alleged perpetrator based on witness testimonies and similarities between the crimes, which might also lead to the discovery of new cases of abuse. The Bavarian Landeskriminalamt supported SoKo "Dennis" by creating offender profiling.

=== Offender description ===
According to a case analysis by Alexander Horn, the offender was characterized as a German-speaking man between the ages of 30 and 50, who was noticeably tall, sturdy of build and had a deep voice. He was supposedly knowledgeable of northern Germany, in particular the area around Bremen, and possibly lived there. He had likely had a connection to the areas around Hepstedt and Badenstedt in the early 1990s.

During his crimes, the man wore dark clothes, a mask and a pair of gloves, and managed to intimidate young children. Initially described as athletic, the perpetrator put on weight over the years. He travelled mostly by car and seemed to have previous experience around children. He likely lived alone and was socially integrated, but had pedophilic tendencies towards young boys, a fact that had been possibly noticed by his family and close friends.

Investigators noted the perpetrator's willingness to take risks, as he had exposed himself to many crime scenes with a high possibility of discovery. For example, he had transported the three German murder victims over long distances by car, and in the case of Dennis Rostel, more than 250 kilometres (160 mi) over the guarded border between Denmark and Germany. Nevertheless, he left few traces. Investigators theorized that the offender was of above-average intelligence, planned his actions carefully in advance and carried them out in a familiar environment.

According to criminologist Stephan Harbort, the perpetrator was classified as extremely dangerous: '"This is a person with high levels of methodicalness. He is able to gain the trust of children. Those who have the discipline to do so for twelve years have reached a stage where there is no longer any inhibition to kill. Such a person no longer kills just children. As a banal quarrel with any ordinary person can be enough to commit murder."

=== Search and arrest ===
Despite a thorough investigation of the victims' relatives and acquaintances, as well as a mass DNA testing of hundreds of men from northern Germany, Ney initially went undetected. Special commissions from Germany, France and the Netherlands worked closely together in the case. The police looked into 7,800 clues without any major breakthrough.

The perpetrator and his crimes were also made public several times on television, including special broadcasts from stern TV, Spiegel TV, Ungeklärte Morde and Galileo. In addition, reports of the crimes were broadcast three times on Aktenzeichen XY… ungelöst. However, viewers were unable to provide authorities with any crucial information.

In August 2010, a witness who had seen an old documentary on the Internet about the murders contacted the police. He claimed to have seen the culprit along with the victim Dennis Klein sitting in a car on a forest path in the early morning while he was running track near the abduction site. A "situation sketch" of the suspect was drafted and published on 10 February 2011.

On 15 April 2011, police announced the arrest of a suspect. The crucial clue had come from a previous victim who had been abused by a masked offender in his childhood home in 1995. The victim recognized the offender from the police sketch as a supervisor at a youth camp they had attended years ago, leading the police to arrest Ney. Ney, then 40 years old, had lived in Bremen until September 2000, and confessed to the murders after the first interrogations. He admitted to killing Jahr, Rostel and Klein and abusing about 40 other children. He was also suspected of murdering Coulom in France and Nicky Verstappen in the Netherlands, but denied involvement in both cases. In 2020, a Dutch man was convicted of kidnapping and sexual abuse that lead to Verstappen's death in 1998.

=== Confession ===
During his interrogation, Ney stated that he had committed the three murders in order to cover up the sexual abuse and not be identified as a culprit. According to Ney, he strangled Jahr because he had taken him to his car and feared that the boy might have noted his license plate number. Ney also claimed to have spent a few days on a holiday with Dennis Rostel in a holiday home near Holstebro in Denmark before strangling him. Ney claimed that he smothered Klein because he defended himself against Ney's abuse too loudly.

Ney had already been suspected by the police prior to his arrest. At the age of 17, he had threatened two parents from Bremen with kidnapping and killing their children. In 1989, he was convicted for the extortion of 150,000 Deutsche Mark under juvenile criminal law while performing charitable work.

After his criminal record was wiped from the educational register at the age of 24, Ney applied for a foster son in 1995 at the Social Services Office in Bremen. At the time, Ney was a young and single student who lived on a Bundesausbildungsförderungsgesetz budget. Though regarded as an unusual candidate for such a role, the youth welfare office accepted him as a foster father due to the small number of available foster parents.

A guardianship judge of the district court of Bremen-Blumenthal, in front of whom Ney had previously appeared as a teenager because of the attempted extortion, spoke twice to Ney in 1996, granting him custody of the 12-year-old boy. The boy lived with Ney until he was old enough to leave, but was never sexually abused by him.

After completing his pedagogy studies, Ney broke off the subsequent legal clerkship before his second state examination. With the help of falsified documents, Ney got a job as a social education teacher in a daycare position at a Hamburg foundation, which he held until early 2008. In the years before, Ney had held a job as a youth worker alongside his studies and had thus become familiar with some of his future victims and their daily lives.

In 2005, he was charged with sexual abuse in two minor cases, but both were settled against a payment of 1,800 euros. In 2006, Ney attempted to blackmail a social worker from Berlin by threatening to report him for possession of child pornography, demanding 20,000 euros for his silence. As a result, Ney was charged with attempted extortion and sentenced to ten month's probation. As part of the investigation, the police searched Ney's apartment and secured his computer, which was found to contain about 30,000 photographs featuring child pornography. As the police could not verify when the images had been stored and last accessed, the prosecutor stopped the proceedings due to the statute of limitations ending in 2007. Investigators failed to detect that some of the photographs in the exhibit complied by the Hamburg police showed victims of Ney's previous crime sprees.

Ney had been first interviewed by SoKo "Dennis" back in 2007, as he was found to match the offender's profile, but he denied having anything to do with the crimes. The request for Ney's saliva sample, which he refused to provide, could not be enforced legally due to a lack of reasonable doubt.

== Imprisonment ==
On 15 July 2011, the prosecution filed charges against Ney for threefold murder and sexual abuse in 20 cases. Around 20 more cases of abuse were already barred. On 10 October, the trial began before the district court of Stade, where the defendant was summoned. Psychological evaluations found Ney as having a pedophilic disorder, but not criminally insane. He was described as a continuous threat with a high risk of reoffending. During the trial, there were indications of further acts of abuse in the 2000s and thus, an increased probability of recidivism.

On 27 February 2012, Ney was sentenced to life imprisonment for the murder of the three boys and 20 cases of sexual abuse, with subsequent preventative detention condemned. In addition, the court noted the particular severity of Ney's crimes. However, Ney's legal team appealed the verdict regarding preventative detention.

On 10 January 2013, the Federal Court of Justice (BGH) took place and cancelled the preventative detention. This was justified by the statement that according to the current legal situation, preventative detention can only be ordered for the indispensable protection of the general public. Since the BGH has confirmed the particular severity of the crime, the minimum term of imprisonment of 15 years, which is usual for life imprisonment, will be extended. In addition, a discharge can only be carried out as a result of the demonstrable harmlessness of the convicted person. However, such proof would also suspend the execution of the preventative detention. Otherwise, it can be assumed that Ney will remain in custody, possibly until the end of his life. He has been serving his sentence at Justizvollzugsanstalt Celle, where he remained as of September 2021.

=== Later developments ===
In late 2011 Ney's computer was again confiscated by authorities after several storage media hidden in Ney's former apartment were discovered by a new tenant. However, investigators were unable to decrypt the password and view its contents. Ney refused to provide the password, saying that he wanted to protect the privacy of his friends and family. Authorities stated that without Ney's help, the chances of decrypting the computer's password were low. In late 2016, Ney voluntarily provided his computer's password to the authorities. As of May 2017, the evaluation of the data carriers had not been completed.

In January 2021, Ney was extradited to Nantes, France, after a preliminary investigation into him was opened in relation to the murder of Jonathan Coulom. It was claimed by a cellmate that Ney had confessed to an additional five murders, including one in France. In September 2021, he was returned to Germany because there was not enough evidence to charge Ney. French authorities requested extradition again in November 2025, which Ney's attorney was opposed due to "reservations" from his clients. The hearing to decide over the matter was postponed to early 2026. On June 4, 2026, Martin Ney was found guilty and sentenced to life in prison for the 2004 murder of Jonathan Coulom.

== In the media ==
- The case was partially covered in the episode "Scream of the Geese" on the Radio-Retort program on Radio Bremen
- ZDF released a film about Ney titled In the Name of My Son, with Tobias Moretti and Inka Friedrich in the lead roles and Damir Lukačević acting as director. It was broadcast on 2 May 2016.

== See also ==
- List of German serial killers
