= Xiamen Dada—Exhibition of Modern Art =

Major exhibition that emerged from the Chinese 85 New Wave art movement

Xiamen Dada—Exhibition of Modern Art was a major exhibition that emerged from the Chinese 85 New Wave art movement. It was organised by the Xiamen Dada group, one of the more radical avant-garde groups that emerged in China in the 1980s. The exhibition took place in the Xiamen People's Art Museum (now The Cultural Centre of Xiamen) in Xiamen, Fujian Province, from September 28 to October 5, 1986. Participating artists included Huang Yongping (the co-founder of the Xiamen Dada group), Lin jiahua and Yu Xiaogang, Jiao Yaoming. The exhibition marked the art group Xiamen Dada's entrance into contemporary Chinese art history and was later transformed into an initiating exhibition in a three-stage event organized by Xiamen Dada in 1986.

== Background ==
The exhibition is widely discussed and examined in the context of the 85 New Wave Movement in China, and Xiamen Dada as a “quite unique group” in the Movement. Critiques also explicitly link the exhibition with political movements like the Cultural Revolution and the May Fourth Movement when commenting on the exhibition as a spiritual extension of reflections and critiques on Chinese culture.

== Exhibition concept ==
A complementary text or concept note of the Exhibition was Huang Yongping's Xiamen Dada — A Kind of Postmodernism? that he wrote for the art newspaper Fine Arts in China. Huang notes in the article that the exhibition “serves as a fortunetelling one in terms of all kinds of possibilities localized Chinese modern art might have.” The text also connects the Xiamen Dada group with Dada the European avant-garde art movement and puts forward Huang's reinterpretation of Dadaism: “Zen is Dada, Dada is Zen. Postmodernism is the modern renaissance of Zen. Both concepts make their names as the utmost candid and profound — not in terms of the aesthetics, but in terms of the impossibility of the real, and extreme doubt and distrust.” The anti-art sentiment would be echoed in the exhibition, and the exhibition would later be characterized as a radical anti-art action in media coverages and critiques.

== Participating artists ==
Fourteen artists participated in the Exhibition, according to Huang Yongping's retrospective recording of the event. These include: Huang Yong Ping (黄永砯）, Lin Jiahua (林嘉华), Yu Xiaogang (俞晓刚), Jiao Yaoming (焦耀明), Ji Nai Jin (紀乃進) Chen Lixiong (蔡立雄) Chengzong (陈承宗)

A total of 83 works were exhibited.

== Development ==
The Exhibition is widely regarded as the prologue in a three-stage event.

- Xiamen Dada—Exhibition of Modern Art (1986.9.28-10.5, the then Xiamen People's Art Museum).
- Xiamen Dada, Dismantling - Destruction - Burning (1986.11.20-11.23, in front of the then Xiamen People's Art Museum). Sixty works previously on show in the Xiamen Dada - Modern Art Exhibition was dismantled, destructed, and eventually burned in the square in front of the then Xiamen People's Art Museum. The burning took place on November 23, 1986, and lasted for about two hours. About 200 audiences were present at the event.
- Xiamen Dada, Exhibition for Fujian Art Museum (1986.12.16-12.19, Fujian Art Museum). The Xiamen Dada group curated and installed the exhibition in two days (1986.12.14 - 1986. 12.15) with the help of professors and students from the Department of Art, Fujian Normal University. The exhibition featured found objects which were primarily found in the Fujian Art Museum's surroundings. It was up for about two hours before it was shut down by the museum officials.
