= Serpent d'océan =

Sculpture by Huang Yong Ping

- Ocean Serpent (English)
- Artist: Huang Yong Ping
- Year: 2012
- Medium: Aluminium
- Dimensions: 130 m (430 ft)
- Location: Saint-Brevin-les-Pins, Loire-Atlantique, France; 47°16′04″N 2°10′15″W

Serpent d'océan (lit. "Serpent of the Ocean" in French) is a work by artist Huang Yong Ping. Depicting a long, winding sea serpent skeleton, it is installed in the intertidal zone at Saint-Brevin-les-Pins, Loire-Atlantique, France, and was inaugurated on 20 June 2012.

== Description ==
Serpent d'océan is a monumental sculpture made of aluminium, with a total length of 130 metres (430 ft). It represents the skeleton of an immense imaginary sea serpent whose vertebrae undulate laterally along its length, culminating in an open mouth.

The work is installed at the tip of the Nez-de-Chien, in Mindin, in the territory of the commune of Saint-Brevin-les-Pins in the French département of Loire-Atlantique, at the limit where the Loire estuary joins the Atlantic Ocean. It spreads out over the foreshore area: the serpent's tail is located at the low tide limit, its head at the high tide limit. The sculpture is therefore covered and uncovered during the course of each tide: at low tide it is possible to walk around it, but only the head and the top of the vertebrae stick out at high tide. It is intended to be gradually invaded by vegetation and marine fauna.

The shape of the snake joins that of the Saint-Nazaire bridge, visible nearby; while the vertebrae are reminiscent of the nearby carrelets (lift nets).

== History ==
The work was produced as part of the 2012 edition of the Estuaire festival and co-financed by the European Union through the European Regional Development Fund. It was inaugurated on 20 June 2012.

== Artist ==
Huang Yong Ping was a contemporary artist and prominent member of the 1980s Chinese avant-garde movement. Born in 1954 in Xiamen, China, he lived in France from 1989 until his death in 2019. He favored the connection of diverse meanings and often addressed the notions of mixing identity and culture. The sculpture is a play on the symbolism of a snake in Western versus Eastern culture.

In 2016, Yong Ping made an even larger serpent measuring 240 metres (790 ft) as part of the Monumenta series at the Grand Palais in Paris.

== See also ==
- Architectural sculpture – Use of sculptural techniques in architecture
- The Little Mermaid – Sculpture by Edvard Eriksen
