= Saint-Viaud =

- Commune
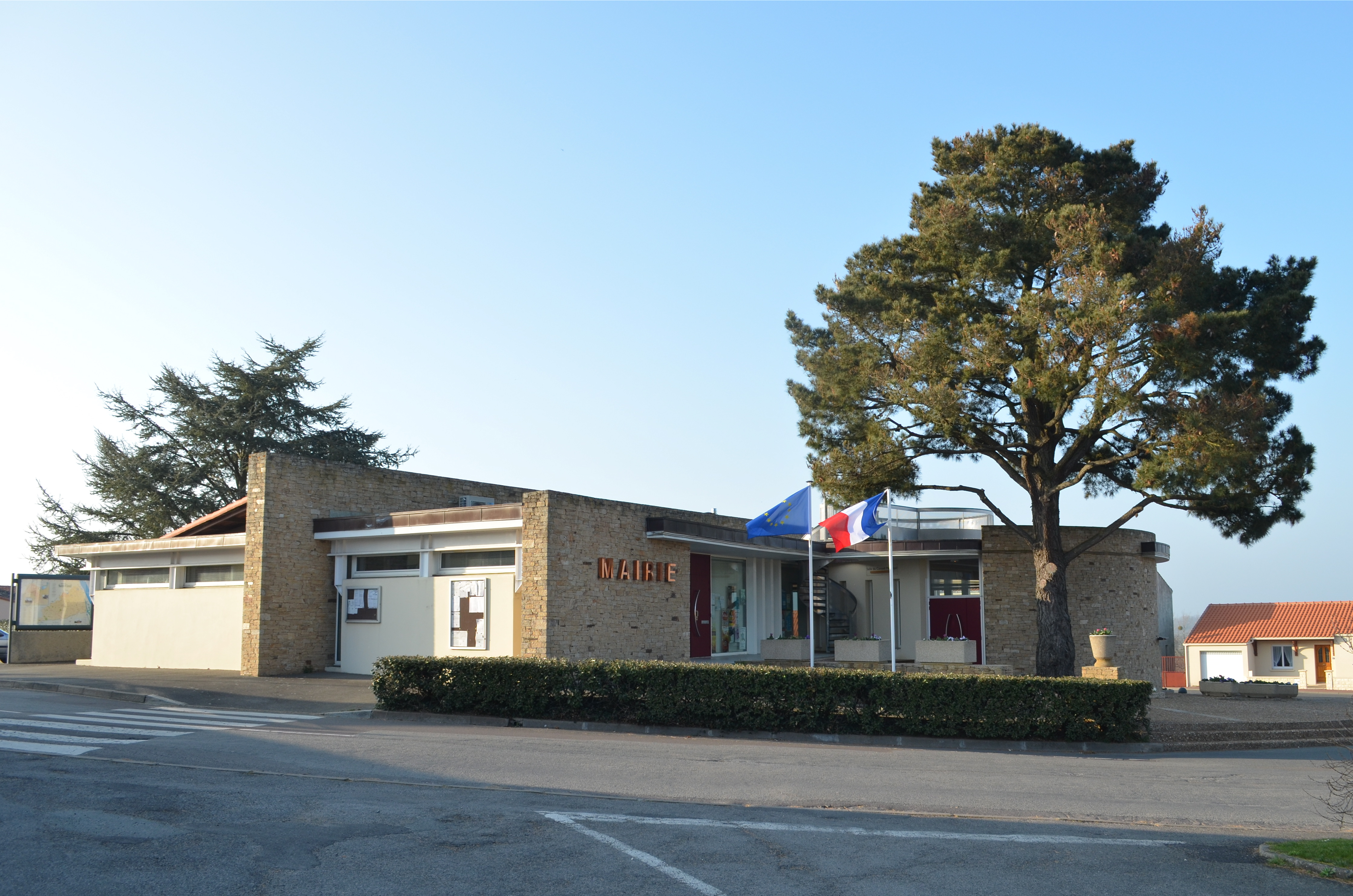
- The town hall in Saint-Viaud

- Coat of arms
- Location of Saint-Viaud
- Location within France Location within Pays de la Loire
- Coordinates: 47°15′22″N 2°01′06″W
- Country: France
- Region: Pays de la Loire
- Department: Loire-Atlantique
- Arrondissement: Saint-Nazaire
- Canton: Saint-Brevin-les-Pins
- Intercommunality: Sud-Estuaire

Government
  - Mayor (2020–2026): Roch Chéraud
- Area^{1}: 32.63 km^{2} (12.60 sq mi)
- Elevation: 30 m (98 ft)
- Highest elevation: 51 m (167 ft)
- Lowest elevation: 0 m (0 ft)
- Population (2023): 2,929
  - Density: 89.76/km^{2} (232.5/sq mi)
- Time zone: UTC+01:00 (CET)
  - Summer (DST): UTC+02:00 (CEST)
- INSEE/Postal code: 44192 /44320
- ^{1} French Land Register data, which excludes lakes, ponds, glaciers > 1 km^{2} (0.386 sq mi or 247 acres) and river estuaries.

Saint-Viaud (French pronunciation: [sɛ̃ vjo]; Breton: Sant-Widel-Skovrid) is a commune in the Loire-Atlantique department in western France.

== Population ==
Historical population
Year	Pop.	±% p.a.
1968	1,508	—
1975	1,359	−1.48%
1982	1,576	+2.14%
1990	1,713	+1.05%
1999	1,837	+0.78%
2007	2,076	+1.54%
2012	2,264	+1.75%
2017	2,510	+2.08%
2023	2,929	+2.61%
Source: INSEE

== See also ==
- Communes of the Loire-Atlantique department
