= Fei Dawei =

Paris-Based Art Critic

Fei Dawei (Chinese: 费大为, born 1954) is a Paris-based art critic and curator. He belonged to the first generation of art critics and curators in China after the Cultural Revolution, especially to the '85 New Wave.

== Biography ==
Dawei earned a bachelor's degree in History of Art from the Central Academy of Fine Arts, Beijing, in 1985.

He advised the curators of the 1989 Magiciens de la Terre exhibit at the Centre Pompidou in Paris, introducing the organizer Jean-Hubert Martin to Chinese artists for the event. He was also involved in organizing the 1989 China/Avant-Garde exhibition at the National Art Museum of China in Beijing, along with Li Xianting and Gao Minglu. He moved permanently to France after being awarded a Chercheur Libre research grant by the French Ministry of Foreign Affairs in 1989.

In the early 1990s, he introduced the Fondation Cartier to leading contemporary Chinese artists.

He curated the Chine Demain pour Hier exhibition in Pourrieres, France in 1990, where Cai Guoqiang, Huang Yong Ping, Chen Zhen, Yan Pei Ming, Gu Wenda, and Yang Jie Chang were represented. In 1991, he was the chief curator of the Exceptional Passage exhibition, in Fukuoka, Japan and curated the first Promenade in Asia exhibition in Tokyo, Japan, in collaboration with the cultural branch of Shiseido, in 1994 (and the second edition in 1997). A year later, he curated the Asiana exhibition during the Venice Biennale, Italy.

From 1995 to 2003, he was one of the juries for the UNESCO-Aschberg Bursaries for Artists.

In 1996, he curated the Between Limits exhibition at Sonje Museum. In 2004, he was the chief curator of the All under Heaven exhibition with the MUHKA (Museum of Contemporary Art) and the KMSKA (Royal Museum of Fine Arts) in Antwerp, Belgium, and The Monk and The Demon exhibition at the Museum of Contemporary Art in Lyon, France.

In 2002, Fei became the director of the Guy & Myriam Ullens Foundation to manage its collection of Chinese contemporary art and its new Ullence Center for Contemporary Art (UCCA) in Beijing's 798 Art District. From 2005 to 2008, he was director of the Ullens Center for Contemporary Art (UCCA) in Beijing, China.

In 2007, he curated the '85 New Wave Inaugural Exhibition at the Ullence Center for Contemporary Art, which also blends a lot of his personal collection, a work that was published in the book The ’85 New Wave Archive. The full scope of this project was planned to last more than ten years. He was the general curator of the Lianzhou Foto 2010 photography art fair.

== Ideas and thoughts ==
=== Cultural communication instead of nationalism ===
Fei Dawei, deeply influenced by Henri Bergson, saw oversea activities and cultural communication ("cultural exile" of artists) as an internal impetus to create a new hotbed for new arts to jump outside the framework of nationalism.

Below are quotes from Fei's letter to Li.

- Indeed, quite many well-established artists stopped making any progress after migrating to another country. However, can we then vaguely derive a general conclusion from this phenomenon and therefore deny the possibilities that Chinese artists can make art in the foreign context? I think, the reason why most Chinese artists have lost their talents since they went abroad is not only because of the problems in language and real life, but also the constrained thoughts and thinking process grown from their “cultural originality” which keeps them from entering the contemporary culture in a new environment. Such exhaustion of creativity is due to the artists’ incapability to turn what they’ve learned domestically into something free of cultural borders and enduringly effective. Such incapability is derived from the sealed off and conservative culture that is unique to China. Thus, I prefer to reverse your words by saying that “art will exhaust if it does not leave its cultural motherland”. Of course, when I say to “leave”, what I mean is that the art can only develop if it can exceed at least one aspect of its domestic culture. Today’s world is featured by a globalized cultural communication so we can only realize our uniqueness and vitalize our domestic culture by acknowledging and being involved with cross-cultural and cross-disciplinary studies.
- Only when “domestic culture” steps out of the “domain”, it can become an authentic “domestic culture”.
- From my very personal perspective, the so-called “cultural exiles” is actually “ideological exiles” which is nothing more than homesick of those who are driven out and can’t return home. If one can make wherever a home, and be free of homesick and geographical boundaries, “cultural exiles” won’t exist.
- “Cultural exiles” has another layer of meaning: these artists are forced to leave their fixed resources and audiences which both are determined by their working methods; therefore, when being abroad, they are isolated like a fish out of water.
- An exclusive culture sometimes split one’s body and spirit like a wall. In such culture, one’s psyche is constantly wandering in a rootless manner. One’s body being home causes no home for spirit. Therefore, in this sense, such “cultural exiles” can be a kind of internal impetus of a culture.
- National identity is never acquired through pursuits. It is the part revealed spontaneously from every artist’s creative works. It is a result instead of a goal. Every conscious pursuit of the so-called national identity will result in crafty and superficial decorative art. It will eliminate artistic creativity and vilify national culture. Nationalism is the last thing ever wanted but national identity is an inevitable fact regardless of your need – you can only decide how to face it.

== Publications and ongoing projects ==
- 85 Xinchao Dang'an I (An Archive of '85 New Wave Movement)
- 85 Xinchao Dang'an II (An Archive of '85 New Wave Movement)

Various book reviews show appreciation especially to the parts of Huang Yong Ping and Xiamen Dada

== Distinctions ==
- 1999: Chevalier of the Ordre des Arts et des Lettres by the French Ministry of Culture

== Interviews ==
- "Artists are a kind of bird who eats worms"
- "Collecting artworks is way of writing history"
- "Manipulation of the prices of contemporary art is rare but serious"
- "Strict censorship keeps China from becoming a culturally developed country"
- "An interview with the chief curator of the contemporary art museum, Fei Dawei"
- "Those who criticize '85 Movement have never experienced that"
- "Looking for the turning point"
- "You make the exhibit or the exhibit makes you"
- Interview with Fei Dawei, Asia Art Archive, 18 March 2009
- (fr) Yue Minjun, L'ombre du sourire, Fondation Cartier, 2012
