= Candice Breitz =

South African artist

- Born: 1972 (age 53–54); Johannesburg, South Africa
- Education: University of the Witwatersrand; University of Chicago; Columbia University
- Known for: video art
- Website: www.candicebreitz.net

Candice Breitz (born 1972) is a South African artist who works primarily in video and photography. She won a 2007 Prince Pierre de Monaco Prize. Her work is often characterised by multi-channel moving image installations, with a focus on the "attention economy" of contemporary media and culture, often represented in the parallelism of the identification with fictional characters and celebrity figures (such as Michael Jackson, Madonna, Bob Marley, Clint Eastwood, Sharon Stone, John Lennon, Jack Nicholson and Meryl Streep) and widespread indifference to global issues. In 2017, she was selected to represent South Africa at the 57th Venice Biennale.

== Early life and education ==
Breitz was born in Johannesburg in a Jewish family. She holds degrees from the University of the Witwatersrand, the University of Chicago, and Columbia University.

== Work ==
Breitz uses found video footage, appropriating video from popular culture. She is represented by KOW (Berlin), Kaufmann Repetto (Milan / NYC) and the Goodman Gallery (Johannesburg / Cape Town / London).

Breitz's 2016 seven-channel installation, Love Story, shares the personal narratives of six individuals who have fled their countries in response to a range of oppressive conditions: Sarah Ezzat Mardini, who escaped war-torn Syria; José Maria João, a former child soldier from Angola; Mamy Maloba Langa, a survivor from the Democratic Republic of the Congo; Shabeena Francis Saveri, a transgender activist from India; Luis Ernesto Nava Molero, a political dissident from Venezuela; and Farah Abdi Mohamed, an idealistic young atheist from Somalia.

Created as part of Performa Commissions for the Performa Biennial, New York City (2009) is her first live performance. Exploring themes of identity and inclusion, this evening length play follows the formula of a television sitcom. New York City involves four sets of identical twins in two separate but identical productions.

Breitz was featured as one of the inaugural artists at Fotografiska Berlin in 2023, presenting her exhibition Whiteface.

== Academic career ==
Breitz has been a tenured professor at the Braunschweig University of Art since 2007.

== Personal life ==
She currently lives in Berlin.

== Exhibitions ==
=== Solo exhibitions ===
- Yvon Lambert, "Him + Her", New York, 2009
- Kunsthaus Bregenz, "Candice Breitz: The Scripted Life", Bregenz, 2010
- Iziko South African National Gallery and Standard Bank Gallery, "Candice Breitz: Extra!", Johannesburg, 2012
- Australian Centre for the Moving Image, "Candice Breitz: The Character", Melbourne, 2013
- Kunstmuseum Stuttgart, "Candice Breitz: Ponderosa", Stuttgart, 2016
- Museum of Fine Arts, Candice Breitz: Love Story, Boston, 2018
- Fotografiska Berlin, "Whiteface", Berlin, 2023

=== Group exhibitions ===
- Represented South Africa with Mohau Modisakeng at the 57th Venice Biennale, 2017
