= Frossay =

Frossay Froczaè (Gallo) Frozieg (Breton)
- Commune
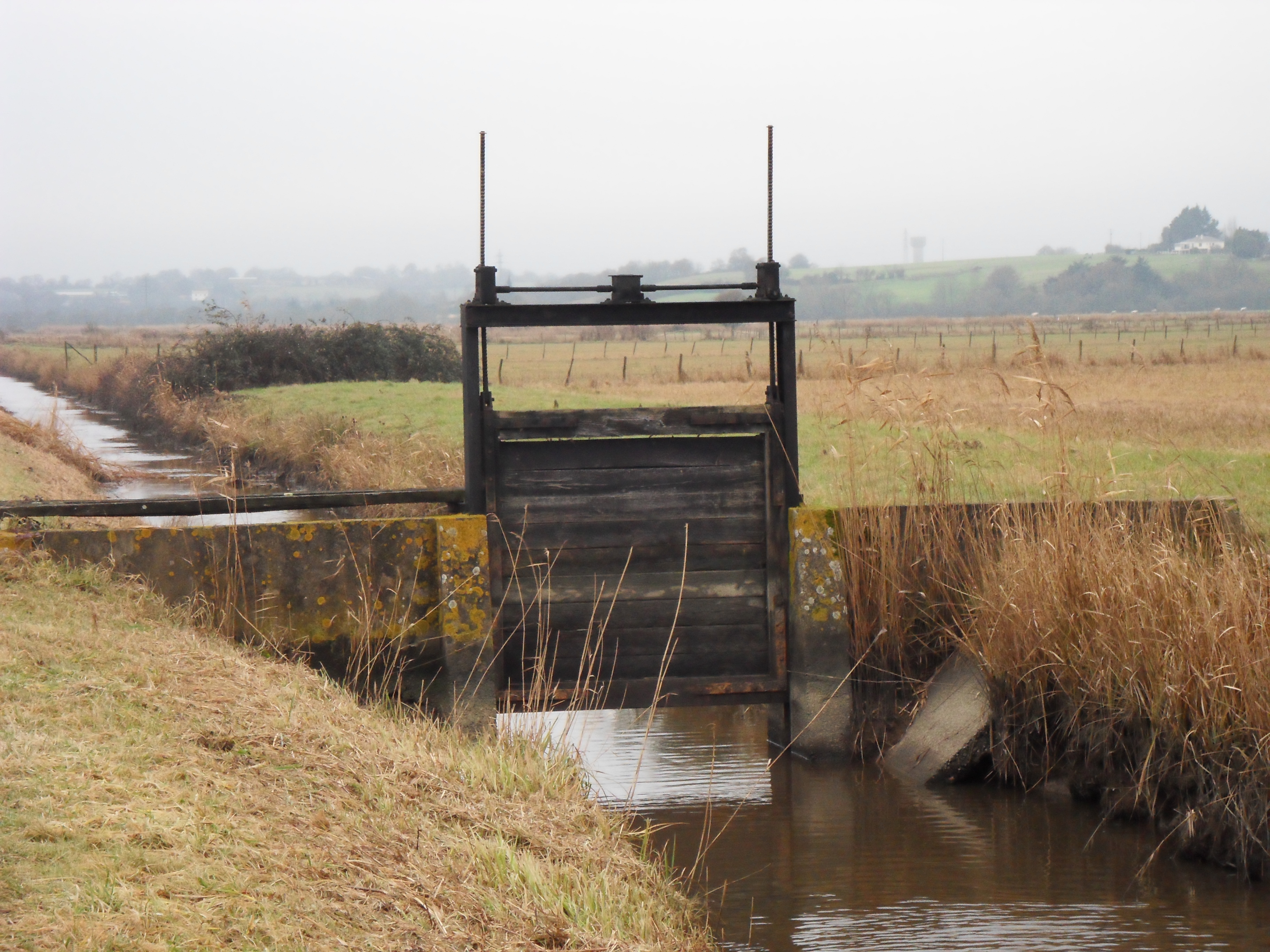
- Lock on Frossay Marsh

- Coat of arms
- Location of Frossay
- Location within France Location within Pays de la Loire
- Coordinates: 47°14′42″N 1°55′59″W
- Country: France
- Region: Pays de la Loire
- Department: Loire-Atlantique
- Arrondissement: Saint-Nazaire
- Canton: Saint-Brevin-les-Pins
- Intercommunality: Sud-Estuaire

Government
  - Mayor (2020–2026): Sylvain Scherer
- Area^{1}: 57.22 km^{2} (22.09 sq mi)
- Highest elevation: 47 m (154 ft)
- Lowest elevation: 0 m (0 ft)
- Population (2023): 3,307
  - Density: 57.79/km^{2} (149.7/sq mi)
- Time zone: UTC+01:00 (CET)
  - Summer (DST): UTC+02:00 (CEST)
- INSEE/Postal code: 44061 /44320
- ^{1} French Land Register data, which excludes lakes, ponds, glaciers > 1 km^{2} (0.386 sq mi or 247 acres) and river estuaries.

Frossay (French pronunciation: [fʁɔsɛ]; Gallo: Froczaè, Breton: Frozieg) is a commune in the Loire-Atlantique department in western France.

== Population ==
Historical population

Year	Pop.	±% p.a.
1793	2,662	—
1821	2,381	−0.40%
1846	2,708	+0.52%
1872	2,804	+0.13%
1901	2,911	+0.13%
1926	2,232	−1.06%
1946	2,017	−0.51%
1962	2,171	+0.46%
1968	2,018	−1.21%

Year	Pop.	±% p.a.
1975	1,913	−0.76%
1982	1,911	−0.01%
1990	2,099	+1.18%
1999	2,106	+0.04%
2007	2,684	+3.08%
2012	3,078	+2.78%
2017	3,221	+0.91%
2023	3,307	+0.44%

Source: EHESS and INSEE (1968-2023)

== See also ==
- Communes of the Loire-Atlantique department
