= Pierre Combescot =

French writer and journalist

Pierre Combescot (9 January 1940 Limoges – 27 June 2017) was a French journalist and writer. He worked for the Canard Enchaîné, under the pseudonym Luc Décygnes. He was also a columnist in Paris Match.

== Awards ==
- 1986 Prix Médicis, for The Funeral of the Sardine
- 1991 Prix Goncourt, for Les Filles du Calvaire.
- Prince Pierre de Monaco Prize

== Works ==
- Louis II de Bavière, Lattès, 1974
- Les Chevaliers du crépuscule, Lattès 1975 (ASIN B0000DQ1EB)
- Les Funérailles de la Sardine, Grasset – 1986 (ISBN 978-2-246-37451-0)
- Les Petites Mazarines, Grasset 1990 (ISBN 2-246-47761-1)
- Les Filles du Calvaire, Grasset – 1991 (ISBN 978-2-246-43541-9)
- La Sainte famille, Grasset 1996 (ISBN 978-2-246-45901-9)
- Le Songe du Pharaon, Grasset 1998 (ISBN 978-2-246-53531-7)
- Lansquenet, Grasset 2002 (ISBN 978-2-246-60351-1)
- Les Diamants de la guillotine, Robert Laffont 2003 (ISBN 978-2-221-10045-5)
- Ce soir on soupe chez Pétrone, Grasset 2004 (ISBN 978-2-246-60341-2)
- Pour mon plaisir et ma délectation charnelle, Grasset 2009 (ISBN 978-2-246-63101-9)
