= La Montagne, Loire-Atlantique =

La Montagne La Montàeyn (Gallo) Ar Menez (Breton)
- Commune
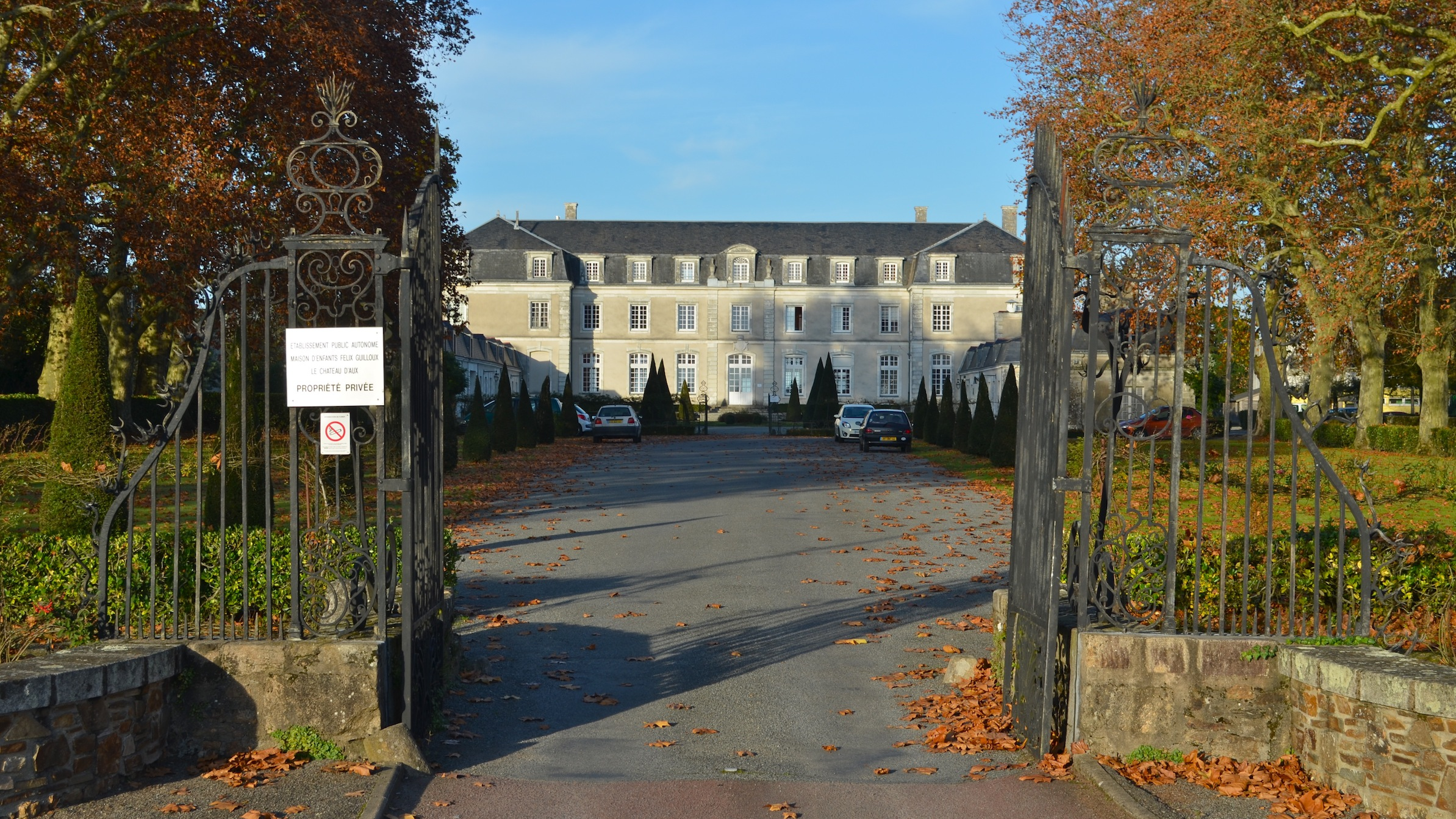
- Chateau d'Aux

- Coat of arms
- Location of La Montagne
- Location within France Location within Pays de la Loire
- Coordinates: 47°11′00″N 1°41′00″W
- Country: France
- Region: Pays de la Loire
- Department: Loire-Atlantique
- Arrondissement: Nantes
- Canton: Saint-Brevin-les-Pins
- Intercommunality: Nantes Métropole

Government
  - Mayor (2020–2026): Fabien Gracia
- Area^{1}: 3.64 km^{2} (1.41 sq mi)
- Elevation: 33 m (108 ft)
- Highest elevation: 38 m (125 ft)
- Lowest elevation: 2 m (6.6 ft)
- Population (2023): 6,505
  - Density: 1,790/km^{2} (4,630/sq mi)
- Time zone: UTC+01:00 (CET)
  - Summer (DST): UTC+02:00 (CEST)
- INSEE/Postal code: 44101 /44620
- Dialling codes: 02
- ^{1} French Land Register data, which excludes lakes, ponds, glaciers > 1 km^{2} (0.386 sq mi or 247 acres) and river estuaries.

La Montagne (French pronunciation: [la mɔ̃taɲ]; Gallo: La Montàeyn, Breton: Ar Menez) is a commune in the Loire-Atlantique department in western France.

== Population ==
Historical population

Year	Pop.	±% p.a.
1876	2,106	—
1881	2,309	+1.86%
1886	2,556	+2.05%
1891	2,404	−1.22%
1896	2,595	+1.54%
1901	2,948	+2.58%
1906	3,080	+0.88%
1911	3,117	+0.24%
1921	2,895	−0.74%
1926	2,940	+0.31%
1931	3,232	+1.91%
1936	3,441	+1.26%

Year	Pop.	±% p.a.
1946	3,923	+1.32%
1954	4,136	+0.66%
1962	4,418	+0.83%
1968	5,025	+2.17%
1975	5,165	+0.39%
1982	5,419	+0.69%
1990	5,555	+0.31%
1999	5,841	+0.56%
2007	5,999	+0.33%
2012	5,981	−0.06%
2017	6,231	+0.82%
2023	6,505	+0.72%

Source: EHESS and INSEE (1968-2023)

== See also ==
- Communes of the Loire-Atlantique department
