= New National Museum of Monaco =

Art museum in Monaco

Coordinates: 43°43′58″N 7°24′50″E

View toward Villa Sauber in 2021

The New National Museum of Monaco (French: Nouveau Musée National de Monaco; NMNM), formerly the National Museum of Monaco (Musée National de Monaco), is a museum of contemporary visual art in Monaco. It is situated in two locations, the Villa Sauber and the Villa Paloma. The museum began organizing temporary exhibitions at Villa Paloma in 2010. The venues display two exhibitions annually.

== Exhibitions ==
Exhibitions at the museum have included retrospectives of Erik Bulatov and Yinka Shonibare; "Monacopolis" – depictions of architecture, town planning and urbanisation in Monaco; "Artifices instables – stories of ceramics", from September 2020 through January 2021; and, in 2022, "Newton, Riviera", a photo exhibition in homage to Helmut Newton was followed by an installation to spotlight artist and designer Christian Bérard.

NMNM holds an extensive collection of works relating to Dutch-French painter Kees van Dongen.

== Notable people ==
- Marie-Claude Beaud, director of New National Museum of Monaco, 2009-2021
- Björn Dahlström, director, appointed 2022,

== See also ==
- List of museums in Monaco
