= Canton of Saint-Brevin-les-Pins =

Canton of Loire-Atlantique, France

Coordinates: 47.25°N 2.16°W

The canton of Saint-Brevin-les-Pins is an administrative division of the Loire-Atlantique department, western France. It was created at the French canton reorganisation which came into effect in March 2015. Its seat is in Saint-Brevin-les-Pins.

It consists of the following communes:

1. Corsept
2. Frossay
3. La Montagne
4. Paimbœuf
5. Le Pellerin
6. Saint-Brevin-les-Pins
7. Saint-Jean-de-Boiseau
8. Saint-Père-en-Retz
9. Saint-Viaud
