= Stephen Conroy (artist) =

Scottish painter

- Born: 1964 (age 61–62); Helensburgh, Scotland
- Known for: Painting

Stephen Conroy (born 1964) is a Scottish figurative painter. Born in Helensburgh, he grew up in nearby Renton and attended St Patrick's High School, Dumbarton. He studied at the Glasgow School of Art between 1982 and 1987.

In the early 1980s Conroy was commissioned by Dumbarton District Council to produce a series of portraits of local luminaries which are now held in the West Dunbartonshire Council Collection. By 1989, Conroy's work had already gained much recognition and praise in the United Kingdom and internationally. The artist has remained in Scotland, where he currently lives and works.

In 1998, Conroy won the Grand Prize of Rainier III, Prince of Monaco.

Conroy's work is part of a number of public and private collections including The British Council, London, England; The Contemporary Art Society, London, England; Frissiras Museum, Athens, Greece; The Metropolitan Museum of Art, New York, New York; National Portrait Gallery, London, England; Robert Fleming Holdings Ltd., London, England; The Royal College of Surgeons of England; Scottish National Gallery of Modern Art, Edinburgh, Scotland; Scottish National Portrait Gallery, Edinburgh, Scotland.
