= Murder of Jonathan Coulom =

2004 French murder

Jonathan Coulom
- Born: Jonathan Coulom; 1994; France
- Died: 7 April 2004 (aged 9–10); Saint-Brevin-les-Pins, Loire-Atlantique, France
- Cause of death: Unclear, possibly suffocation
- Body discovered: 19 May 2004
- Height: 4 ft (1.21 m)

The murder of Jonathan Coulom, also referred to as the Jonathan Affair, is a criminal case in which the 10-year-old French boy Coulom was abducted on the night of 7 April 2004, in Saint-Brevin-les-Pins, France. Coulom's body was found bound with a cinderblock in a pond in Guérande on 19 May 2004. Convicted German serial killer Martin Ney, who murdered three German boys between 1992 and 2004, has been charged with the crime as of 26 January 2021. Ney has been extradited to Nantes, France to stand trial for the murder of Coulom.

== Biography ==
Jonathan Coulom lived in Orval, Cher. He was nicknamed "Titi" and "Cowboy" by his parents Virginie and Stéphane and had three sisters. Jonathan had been abandoned by his birth father Laurent, and by the time his mother and stepfather began a relationship he was six months old, with Stéphane having a one year-old daughter of his own. Stéphane had worked as a cable installer before damaging his back in September 2001, and Virginie worked as a cashier until the birth of her youngest daughter. Coulom was a frail child: about 1.4 metres (4.6 ft) tall and just over 30 kilograms (66 lb), and described as shy and suspicious, but still smiling. He loved motorbikes and football, and had a golden earring in his left ear.

== Disappearance and investigation ==
Coulom was aged 10 and in CM2. On 31 March 2004, he was one of 24 children from classes CM1-CM2 to leave on a school trip to the seaside resort of Saint-Brevin-les-Pins in Loire-Atlantique for one week in "PEP 18" summer camp. The camp was located in the southern part of the town, bordered by the blue road and the aisle of André-Vien, in the Menhir District. At that time of year, the town was nearly deserted and half the residences were unoccupied.

Coulom slept with five other friends in the "Pouligen" room. There was no handle on the inside of the room's door, so for safety, the door was never fully closed when someone was inside. The fence between the resort and the blue road was broken and collapsed in several places, so it was easy to get into the field and get access to the buildings.

On the evening of 6 April 2004, the group went to bed around 11 pm, as a party had been organised. In an adjacent building, another party composed of young adults celebrating their BAFA completion ended around 2 am. During his last round at midnight, the supervisor was certain that Coulom was lying in his bed. The bus driver, who had driven the children to the centre, went to the bathroom in the night between 6 and 7 am, and found that the door of the block where Coulom was sleeping was wide open from the outside. He then closed it.

On the following day, shortly after 7 am, Coulom's disappearance was noted. He had been dressed in pyjamas, and all his belongings were in the room. The night had been cold and rainy.

On 16 April, the prosecutor of Saint-Nazaire opened a judicial investigation into kidnapping and false imprisonment. Catherine Salsac became the lawyer of Coulom's parents.

On 22 April 2004, German investigators of the Bundeskriminalamt contacted French gendarmes because the case bore similarities with those of a German serial killer nicknamed "The Black Man" or "The Masked Man". The killer was believed to have committed about 40 sexual assaults against boys in summer camps and children's homes mostly in northern Germany from 1992 on. Three German boys that had been kidnapped and killed had also been alluded to the perpetrator; 13-year-old Stefan Jahr, 8-year-old Dennis Rostel and 11-year-old Dennis Klein.

A witness claimed to have seen a saloon car with a German registration parked near the resort on the night of Coulom's disappearance.

A small patch of blood was found on a bed sheet where Coulom had been sleeping. Shortly after, a large exercise in DNA sampling and profiling was carried out but produced no results. About 200 DNA samples were taken in five years, and the blood turned out to be that of another child who slept in the same sheets some time before Coulom.

=== Discovery of corpse ===
On the evening of 19 May 2004, Coulom's body was found naked, bound in a fetal position and weighted down with a cinderblock in the small pond of the Porte-Calon manor house at Guérande near the former Ursuline Convent. His neck, wrists and ankles were tied with a nylon cord in the form of a precisely-made marine knot. The pond was not visible from outside the property, as it was under the windows of the manor's tenants.

The medical examiner who undertook the post-mortem on Coulom's body concluded that he had not drowned. As his body showed no bone damage or visible injury and no trace of strangulation or toxic elements, the examiner suggested that he was probably suffocated to death. His body was too degraded to determine if he had been sexually assaulted.

As a first step, the investigators favoured the hypothesis of a local predator because:

- the post-mortem findings led them to believe that Coulom had been kept alive for some time before being killed;
- only a local resident would be familiar with the resort and the mansion, and how to access them discreetly.

== Arrest of Martin Ney ==
In April 2011, German educator Martin Ney was identified by German police as "The Black Man" and arrested. He confessed to several sexual assaults and the murders of the three German boys in 1992, 1995 and 2001, but denied killing Coulom. As there was insufficient evidence to link Ney to Coulom, the police were forced to abandon this line of investigation.

Afterwards, the police investigation shifted to a predator that had operated in a dozen seaside resorts on the Atlantic coast, mainly in the areas of Guérande, Saint-Brevin-les-Pins and La Turballe. He had assaulted or attempted to assault at least 30 girls and boys, aged 7 to 13, between 1982 and 1998.

In April 2018, a fellow inmate of Ney revealed that Ney had admitted to the kidnapping and murder of Coulom. In January 2021, Ney was extradited to Nantes after he was charged with Coulom's murder.

== See also ==
- List of solved missing person cases (2000s)
- List of unsolved murders (2000–present)
- Nicky Verstappen

== TV documentaries ==
- "The Jonathan Coulom Affair", November 4, 2008 in Unsolved, on France 2.
- "Deadly Holidays" (first report) in "...on the Atlantic Coast", on September 29, October 6 and 14, 2014; August 10th, 17th and 25th, 2015 in Crimes, on NRJ 12.
- "Case of the little Jonathan, the mysterious man in black" January 23, 2019, in Criminal Investigations: the magazine of news items on W9.

== Radio broadcast ==
- "The Jonathan Affair, ten years without answers" April 8, 2014; "The Jonathan Affair", April 10, 2018 and "The Jonathan Affair: on the trail of the Black Man", April 23, 2018 in Crime Time with Jacques Pradel, on RTL.
