= Prince Pierre Foundation =

Funding body for the arts and culture

- Named after: Pierre de Polignac (1895–1964)
- Founded: 1966
- Founder: Prince Rainier III
- Type: Philanthropic organization
- Headquarters: Monaco
- Website: www.fondationprincepierre.mc

The Prince Pierre Foundation (Fondation Prince Pierre de Monaco) was established by Prince Rainier III of Monaco in February 1966 to promote culture and the arts through the creation and the awarding of prizes. Prince Rainier III created the foundation in tribute to his father Pierre de Polignac, a great patron of the arts. Each year, prestigious awards are given based on the recommendation of the Foundation's three councils : the literary council, the Musical Council and the Artistic Council.

== History ==
The Prince Pierre Foundation was established by Prince Rainier III of Monaco in February 1966.

Starting in 1988, the foundation was presided by Caroline, Princess of Hanover.

== Prizes and awardees ==
=== Literary Prizes ===
==== The Literary Prize ====
Established in 1951, the Literary Prize recognizes a renowned French-speaking writer for their entire body of work, coinciding with the publication of one of their books. This prize is awarded by the Literary Council, presided over by Princess Caroline of Monaco.

- 2024: Mathieu Belezi for all of his work
- 2023: Jean-Noël Pancrazi for all of his work
- 2022: Vénus Khoury-Ghata for all of her work
- 2021: Annie Ernaux for all of her work
- 2020: Christian Bobin for all of his work
- 2019: Linda Lê for all of her work
- 2018: Maurizio Serra for Malaparte: vies et légende
- 2014: Éric Neuhoff for all his work
- 2013: Alain Mabanckou for Lumières de Pointe Noire
- 2012: Jean-Paul Kauffmann for Courlande
- 2011: Pierre Assouline for Vies de Job
- 2010: Dominique Bona for Clara Malraux
- 2009: Pierre Mertens for Les chutes centrales
- 2008: Jérôme Garcin for L'ami Butler
- 2007: Jacques-Pierre Amette for Un été chez Voltaire
- 2006: Philippe Sollers for Une vie divine
- 2005: Andreï Makine for La femme qui attendait
- 2004: Philippe Beaussant for Le rendez-vous de Venise
- 2003: Philippe Jaccottet for Et, néanmoins
- 2002: Marie-Claire Blais for Dans la foudre et la lumière
- 2001: Diane de Margerie for Maintenant
- 2000: Pascal Quignard for Vie Secrète
- 1999: Pierre Combescot for Le songe du Pharaon
- 1998: Jean-Marie Gustave Le Clézio for Poisson d'or
- 1997: Franz-Olivier Giesbert for La souille
- 1996: Jean Raspail for l'Anneau du pêcheur
- 1995: Jacques Lacarrière for Au coeur des mythologies
- 1994: Angelo Rinaldi for all his work
- 1993: Paul Guimard for all his work
- 1992: Hector Bianciotti for all his work
- 1991: Jean-Marie Rouart for all his work
- 1990: Gilles Lapouge for all his work
- 1989: Béatrix Beck for all her work
- 1988: Jean Starobinski for all his work
- 1987: Yves Berger for all his work
- 1986: Dominique Fernandez for all her work
- 1985: Françoise Sagan for all her work

==== The Discovery Grant ====
Established in 2001 to mark the 50th anniversary of the Literary Prize, this grant was initially awarded every two years. Now granted annually, it recognizes a French-speaking author for their first work of fiction. As with the Literary Prize, the shortlisted authors are nominated by the members of the Literary Council.

- 2024: Mokhtar Amoudi for Les conditions idéales
- 2023: Éric Chacour for Ce que je sais de toi
- 2022: Thomas Louis for Les chiens de faïence
- 2021: Abigail Assor for Aussi riche que le roi
- 2020: Salomé Berlemont-Gilles for Le premier qui tombera
- 2019: Grégory Le Floch for In the forest of the hamlet of Hardt
- 2018: Sébastien Ministru for Apprendre à lire
- 2007: Carole Martinez for Le cœur cousu

==== The High-school Pupils Favorite Choice ====
Established in 2007, the prize is awarded by a jury of high school students from the Principality of Monaco, who select a winner from a shortlist of books. In collaboration with the Direction de l'Éducation Nationale, de la Jeunesse et des Sports of Monaco, this project aims to introduce students to the world of publishing and contemporary literature.

- 2024: Cécile Tlili, for Un simple dîner
- 2023: Julia Minkowski, Par-delà l'attente
- 2022: Marie Vingtras, Blizzard
- 2021: Roukiata Ouedraogo for Du miel sous les galettes
- 2020: Mathieu Palain, for Sale Gosse
- 2019: Aurélie Razimbaud for A Life of Hot Stones
- 2018: Emmanuelle Favier for Le courage qui faut aux rivières

=== Musical Prizes ===
==== Music Composition Prize ====
Aiming to support and encourage musical creation, the Music Composition Prize, created in 1960, awards a composer for a recent musical work. Granted every three years, this prize intends to promote artistic creation through the production of a new work. The Music Composition Prize is granted following deliberations by the Musical Council, chaired by Julian Anderson.

- 2024: Hans Abrahamsen for "Vers le silence"
- 2021: Michael Jarrell for Eindrücke (Violin Concerto)
- 2018: Thomas Larcher for Symphony No 2, Kenotaph
- 2015: George Benjamin, for Written on Skin
- 2012: Martin Smolka for Blue bells or bell blues
- 2010: Unsuk Chin for Gougalon
- 2009: Jonathan Harvey for Speakings
- 2008: Peter Eotvos for Seven
- 2007: Georges Aperghis for Wölfli-Kantata
- 2006: Helena Tulve for Reyah hadas ’ala
- 2005: Frédéric Durieux for Traverses 1, 2 & 3
- 2004: Luis De Pablo for Frondoso Misterio
- 2003: Salvatore Sciarrino
- 2002: Philippe Manoury for K...
- 2001: Simon Holt for Sunrise' yellow noise
- 2000: Pierre Boulez
- 1999: Matthias Pintscher
- 1998: Elliott Carter for Allegro scorrevole
- 1997: Wolfgang Rihm
- 1996: Gérard Pesson
- 1995: Ramon Lazkano
- 1994: Heinz Holliger for (S)irató
- 1993: John Casken for Still Mine
- 1992: György Kurtag
- 1991: Hans-Jürgen von Bose for 63: Dream Palace
- 1990: Jean-Louis Florentz for Asún
- 1989: George Crumb
- 1988: György Ligeti
- 1987: Sofia Gubaidulina
- 1986: Aribert Reimann
- 1985: Goffredo Petrassi
- 1984: Michael Tippett
- 1983: Andrzej Panufnik, for his whole output
- 1982: Marc-Antonio Consoli
- 1981: Alain Voirpy
- 1980: Gerald Plain
- 1979: Franklin Gyselynck, for String Quartet No 3
- 1978: Daniele Zanettovich for Monumentum Luigi
- 1976: Christopher Brown for Soliloquy
- 1975: Giampaolo Coral
- 1974: Juliusz Luciuk for Portraits Lyriques
- 1973: Romuald Twardowski for Lord Jim
- 1972: Daniele Zanettovich
- 1971: Robert Xavier Rodriguez
- 1970: Krzysztof Meyer for Cyberiada
- 1969: Alain Kremski-Petitgirard, for Le labyrinthe
- 1968: Hans Erich Apostel
- 1966: Robert Xavier Rodriguez
- 1965: Fernando Lopes-Graça
- 1964: Wilhelm Georg Berger
- 1961: Bruno Gillet
- 1960: Jean-Jacques Grunenwald

==== The Young Musician's Favorite Choice ====
In collaboration with the Académie Rainier III of music and drama, and the Education Nationale de la Jeunesse et des Sports of Monaco, the aim is to promote musical creation among young audiences. Founded in 2011, the Young Musician's Favorite Choice is a project intended at introducing young musicien to contemporary composition. Each year, based on a shortlist presented by the Musical Council, students from the Principality's musical classes award this prize for a recent musical work.

- 2024: Paul Novak, for Prisms and mirrors
- 2023: Kristine Tjøgersen for Between Trees
- 2022: York Höller, for his Viola Concerto (2016-2017)
- 2019: Jukka Tiensuu for Teoton, concerto for sheng and orchestra

==== The Musical Contest ====
The Musical Contest aims at fostering the emergence of new talent and servicing as an educational bridge for young audiences. This prize selects an organization or individual based on the quality of their efforts in promoting contemporary music and offers support to help realize a new project.

- 2023: Zeno Baldi for Copia Carbone
- 2022: Kyiv Symphony Orchestra
- 2021: New Music USA
- 2019: Colin Matthews
- 2017: Harry Vogt
- 2016: Documentation Center for Contemporary Music

=== Artistic Prizes ===
==== The International Prize for Contemporary Art (PIAC) ====
First awarded in 1965, the PIAC has been organized by the Foundation Prince Pierre de Monaco since 1983. It has been placed under the vice-presidency of Marie-Claude Beaud. The International Contemporary Art Prize (PIAC) is awarded by the Artistic Council following consultations with international experts from the contemporary art world.

(PR) = Prince Rainier prize, (PG) = Princess Grace Foundation prize

- 2022: Christine Sun Kim for "The Star-Spangled Banner" (2020)
- 2019: Arthur Jafa for Love Is The Message, The Message Is Death
- 2013 Dora Garcia for The Deviant Majority (45th competition)
- 2010 Guido van der Werve for Nummer Twaalf
- 2009 Su-Mei Tse for Some Airing
- 2008 Didier Marcel for Sans titre (labours)
- 2007 Candice Breitz for Mothers and Fathers
- 2006 Saâdane Afif for Power Chords
- 2005 Carlos Caraicoa for Carta a los Censores
- 2004 Max Neumann (PR), Will Cotton (PG)
- 2003 Pierre Edouard (PR), Bernardo Roig (PG)
- 2002 Sergio Sanz (PR), Béatrice Paquali (PG)
- 2001 Nicolas Alquin (PR), Joana Jorge Goncalves (PG)
- 2000 Juan José Aquerreta (PR), Margherita Manzelli (PG)
- 1999 Thomas Orthmann (PR), Orlando Mostyn-Owen (PG)
- 1998 Stephen Conroy (PR), Xavier Nellens (PG)
- 1997 Roberto Matta (PR), Lorenzo Cardi (PG)
- 1996 Vincent Desiderio (PR), Ségolène Franc du Breil (PG)
- 1995 Hugo Sbernini (PR), Alexandra Athanassiades (PG)
- 1994 Motohiko Obara (PR), Alessandro Montalbano (PG)
- 1993 Yuri Kuper (PR?), Didier Mahieu (PG)
- 1992 Oswaldo Vigas (PR), Mauro Corda (PG)
- 1991 Vincent Bioules (PR), Xavier Dambrine (PG)
- 1990 Jean-Paul Chambas (PR), Benoît Luyckx (PG)
- 1989 Barbara Goraczko (PR), Manuel Leonardi (PG)
- 1988 Jean-François Duffau (PR), Christoff Debusschere (PG)
- 1987 Jean-Paul Agosti (PR), Rémi Bourquin (PG)
- 1986 Luis Alberto (PR), Belzere (PG)
- 1985 Richard Boutin (PR), Tadeusz Brudzynski (PG)
- 1984 Pancho Quilici (PR), Matthias Hollander (PG)
- 1983 Jochen Schimmelpenning (PR)

=== Prize for critical essay on contemporary art ===
- 2019: Anneka Lenssen for Abstraction of the Number?

=== Principality Prize ===
Joint award between the Prince Pierre Foundation and the Monaco Philosophical Meetings.

- 2024: Souleymane Bachir Diagne
- 2023: Jacques Rancière
- 2022: Philippe Descola
- 2021: Julia Kristeva
- 2020: Hélène Cixous
- 2019: Georges Didi-Huberman
- 2018: Jean-Luc Marion

== See also ==
- List of European art awards
