= Su-Mei Tse =

Luxembourgish musician, artist and photographer

- Born: 29 January 1973 (age 53); Luxembourg City, Luxembourg
- Education: Luxembourg Conservatory, Conservatoire de Musique, École Nationale Supérieure des Arts Appliqués, École nationale supérieure des Beaux-Arts
- Awards: Fondation Prince Pierre de Monaco Prize for Contemporary Art 2009; SR-Medienkunstpreis 2006; Edward Steichen Award 2005; Golden Lion 2003; Prix d'Art Robert Schuman 2001

Su-Mei Tse: Still from Les Balayeurs du désert (2003)

Su-Mei Tse (born 1973) is a Luxembourgish musician, artist and photographer. Her work combines photography, video, installations and music. In 2003, she received the Golden Lion award at the Venice Biennale for the best national participation.

== Early life ==
The daughter of a Chinese father, a violinist, and an English mother, a pianist, Tse was born on 29 January 1973 in Luxembourg City. First training as a classical cellist at the Luxembourg Conservatory, she won the Cello First Prize in 1991 before continuing her studies at the Conservatoire de Musique in Paris. In 1996, she also received a diploma in Textile & Printing from the École Nationale Supérieure des Arts Appliqués. In 2000, she graduated in plastic arts at the École nationale supérieure des Beaux-Arts in Paris.

== Career ==
Tse's work is the result of a constantly shifting combination of photography, video, and objects in which sound, rhythm and music play an important part. Her early works include La Marionnette (1999) where her performance on the cello is continually interrupted by the puppet strings attached to her limbs, creating a new composition. In Das wohltemperierte Klavier (2001), the music is ruined by the splints bandaged to the player's fingers.

Her breakthrough came in 2003 with Golden Lion she won for her exhibition "Air conditioned" in the Luxembourg pavilion at the Venice Biennial. Her video projection Les balayeurs du désert (The Desert Sweepers) shows street sweepers in their distinctive Paris uniforms pointlessly sweeping away at the desert sand to the soft sound of brooms against asphalt. The second major work "The Echo", also a video, depicts an Alpine scene in which a tiny figure plays the cello, the simple sounds of the instrument being reflected by the mountains. These and the other components of the exhibition were in fact a play on the "ɛ:r" sound in air conditionné denoting the concepts of ère (era), aire (area), air (air and tune).

Tse was selected for a solo exhibition at the Renaissance Society in 2005 titled, "The Ich-Manifestation". The exhibit contained five video works. Her exhibit "Floating Memories" (2009) at the Isabella Stewart Gardner Museum was an installation merging sound, sculpture, and a video projection in which a perpetually revolving gramophone record on an old rug brings back memories of childhood.

Su-Mei Tse is represented by Peter Blum Gallery in New York.

== Awards ==
- 2013 Knight of the Order of Merit of the Grand Duchy of Luxembourg
- 2009: Fondation Prince Pierre de Monaco Prize for Contemporary Art
- 2006: SR-Medienkunstpreis, Saarlandischer Rundfunk, Saarbrücken.
- 2005: Edward Steichen Award, Luxembourg (scholarship and artist residency in New York in 2006).
- 2003: Golden Lion for best national participation, 50th International Art Exhibition, Venice Biennial, Venice, Italy.
- 2001: Prix d'Art Robert Schuman - Interrégional SaarLorLux Award
