= Claude Lévêque =

French artist (b. 1953)

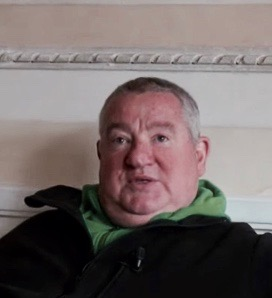
- Born: 27 February 1953 (age 73); Nevers, France
- Education: École des Beaux-Arts in Bourges
- Known for: Sculpture, installation, text art
- Website: http://claudeleveque.com/en/home

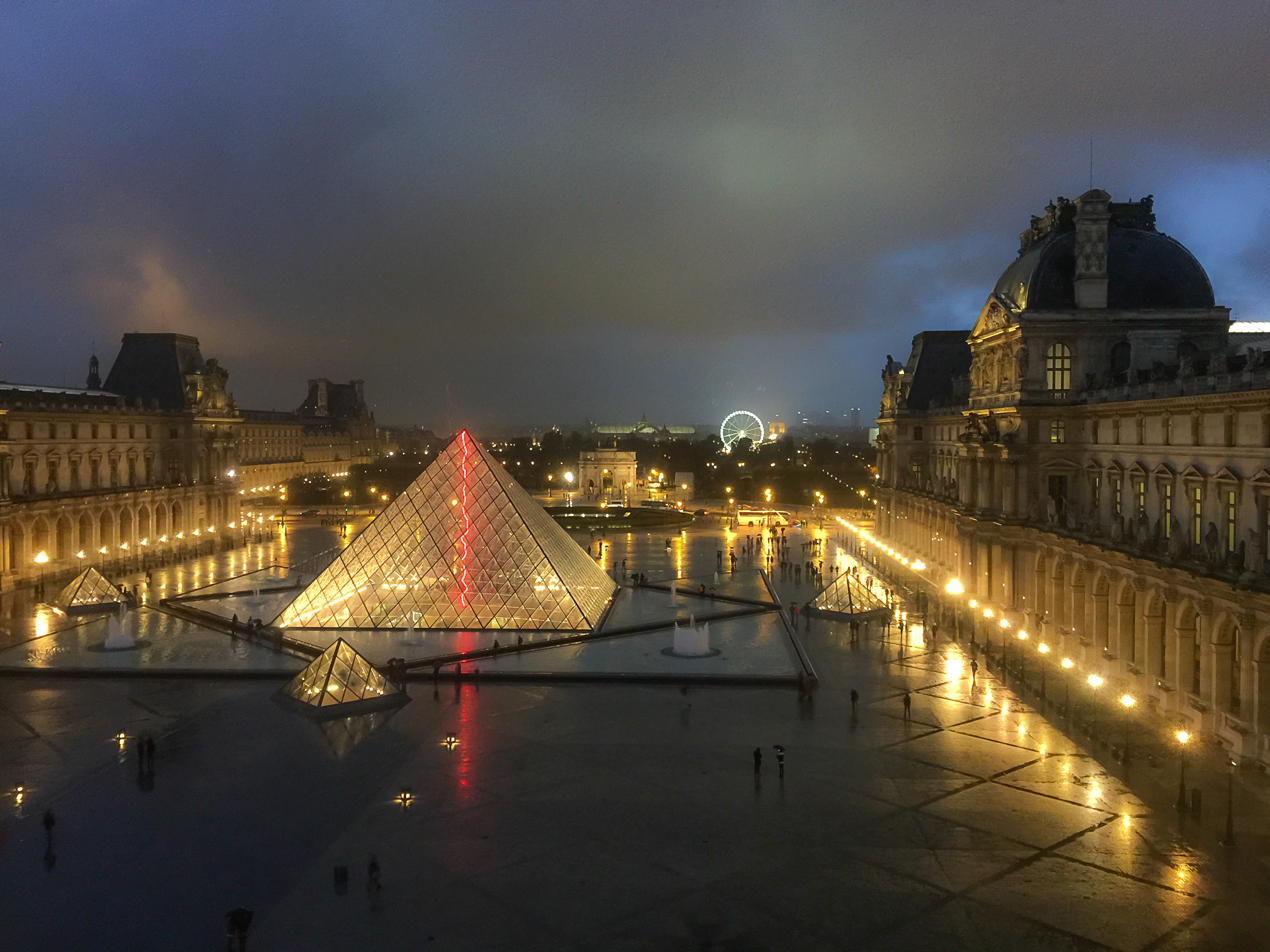
Lévêque's 2014 installation at the Louvre

Claude Lévêque (born 27 February 1953) is a French contemporary installation, sculpture, and new media, artist, best known for his work in neon.

== Biography ==
Lévêque, a graduate of the École des Beaux-Arts in Bourges, received considerable attention for his April 2014 neon installation in I.M. Pei's Louvre Pyramid and its accompanying October 2015 exhibition, Sous Le Plus Grand Chapiteau Du Monde.

In 2009, Lévêque represented France at the 53rd Venice Biennale.

Lévêque lives and works in Montreuil, Seine-Saint-Denis.

Lévêque has been accused of rape of minors in 2019 and as of 2021 is under criminal investigation. He was indicted in 2023. He was accused of further sexual crimes spanning from 1991 to 2007 in November 2024, and in December 2025, criminal prosecution was opened by the court of Saint-Denis.
