= Paimbœuf =

- Commune
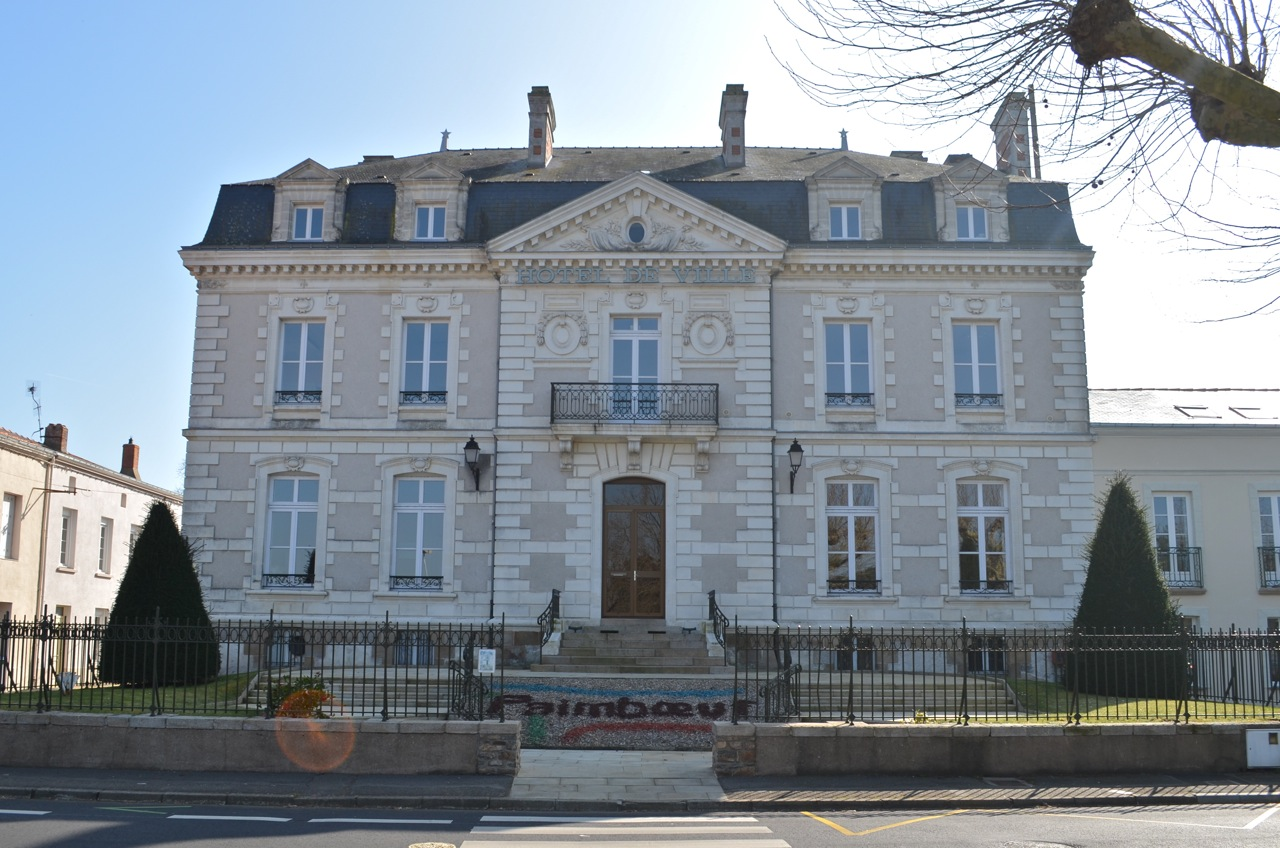
- Town hall

- Coat of arms
- Location of Paimbœuf
- Location within France Location within Pays de la Loire
- Coordinates: 47°17′00″N 2°02′00″W
- Country: France
- Region: Pays de la Loire
- Department: Loire-Atlantique
- Arrondissement: Saint-Nazaire
- Canton: Saint-Brevin-les-Pins
- Intercommunality: Sud-Estuaire

Government
  - Mayor (2020–2026): Raymond Charbonnier
- Area^{1}: 2 km^{2} (0.77 sq mi)
- Highest elevation: 11 m (36 ft)
- Lowest elevation: 0 m (0 ft)
- Population (2023): 3,045
  - Density: 1,500/km^{2} (3,900/sq mi)
- Time zone: UTC+01:00 (CET)
  - Summer (DST): UTC+02:00 (CEST)
- INSEE/Postal code: 44116 /44560
- ^{1} French Land Register data, which excludes lakes, ponds, glaciers > 1 km^{2} (0.386 sq mi or 247 acres) and river estuaries.

Paimbœuf (French pronunciation: [pɛ̃bœf]; Breton: Pembo) is a commune in the Loire-Atlantique department in western France, lying on the south bank of the river Loire upriver from Saint-Nazaire but considerably downriver from Nantes.

In the Napoleonic era it was the site of considerable naval shipbuilding. The United States Navy established a naval air station there on 1 March 1918 to operate dirigibles during World War I. The base closed shortly after the First Armistice at Compiègne.

== Population ==
Historical population

Year	Pop.	±% p.a.
1793	4,509	—
1821	3,376	−1.03%
1846	3,878	+0.56%
1872	2,849	−1.18%
1901	2,196	−0.89%
1926	2,624	+0.71%
1946	2,567	−0.11%
1962	3,580	+2.10%
1968	3,802	+1.01%

Year	Pop.	±% p.a.
1975	3,565	−0.92%
1982	3,321	−1.01%
1990	2,842	−1.93%
1999	2,758	−0.33%
2007	3,093	+1.44%
2012	3,228	+0.86%
2017	3,090	−0.87%
2023	3,045	−0.24%

Source: EHESS and INSEE (1968-2023)

== See also ==
- Communes of the Loire-Atlantique department
