= Saint-Brevin-les-Pins =

- Commune
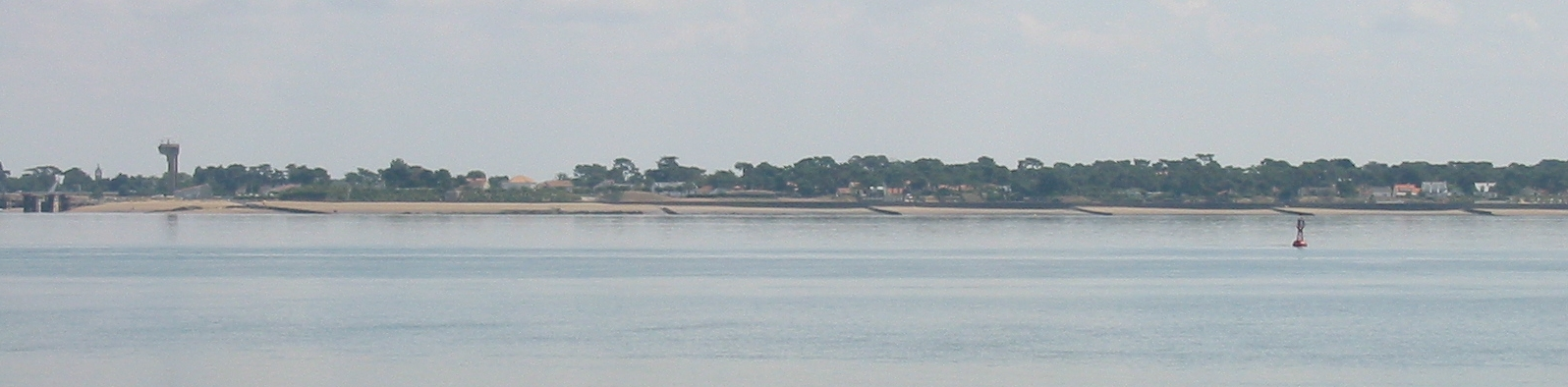
- Coastline of Saint-Brevin-les-Pins, seen from Saint-Nazaire

- Coat of arms
- Location of Saint-Brevin-les-Pins
- Location within France Location within Pays de la Loire
- Coordinates: 47°14′55″N 2°09′56″W
- Country: France
- Region: Pays de la Loire
- Department: Loire-Atlantique
- Arrondissement: Saint-Nazaire
- Canton: Saint-Brevin-les-Pins
- Intercommunality: Sud-Estuaire

Government
  - Mayor (2023–2026): Dorothée Pacaud
- Area^{1}: 19.29 km^{2} (7.45 sq mi)
- Highest elevation: 39 m (128 ft)
- Lowest elevation: 0 m (0 ft)
- Population (2023): 14,541
  - Density: 753.8/km^{2} (1,952/sq mi)
- Time zone: UTC+01:00 (CET)
  - Summer (DST): UTC+02:00 (CEST)
- INSEE/Postal code: 44154 /44250
- ^{1} French Land Register data, which excludes lakes, ponds, glaciers > 1 km^{2} (0.386 sq mi or 247 acres) and river estuaries.

Saint-Brevin-les-Pins (French pronunciation: [sɛ̃ bʁevɛ̃ le pɛ̃]; also Saint-Brévin-les-Pins; Breton: Sant-Brewenn; Gallo: Saent-Bréven) is a commune in the Loire-Atlantique department in western France.

It is known as the site of the serpent d'océan, a giant sea serpent sculpture by artist Huang Yong Ping.

== Population ==
Historical population

Year	Pop.	±% p.a.
1793	986	—
1800	913	−1.09%
1806	1,162	+4.10%
1821	1,079	−0.49%
1831	1,023	−0.53%
1841	944	−0.80%
1846	980	+0.75%
1851	1,026	+0.92%
1856	1,047	+0.41%
1861	1,085	+0.72%
1866	1,159	+1.33%
1872	1,188	+0.41%
1876	1,215	+0.56%
1881	1,202	−0.21%
1886	1,204	+0.03%
1891	1,348	+2.29%
1896	1,566	+3.04%
1901	1,641	+0.94%

Year	Pop.	±% p.a.
1906	1,872	+2.67%
1911	1,964	+0.96%
1921	2,318	+1.67%
1926	2,760	+3.55%
1931	3,117	+2.46%
1936	3,387	+1.68%
1946	6,008	+5.90%
1954	7,087	+2.09%
1962	7,357	+0.47%
1968	8,008	+1.42%
1975	8,614	+1.05%
1982	8,582	−0.05%
1990	8,688	+0.15%
1999	9,594	+1.11%
2007	12,055	+2.90%
2012	13,088	+1.66%
2017	13,802	+1.07%
2023	14,541	+0.87%

Source: EHESS and INSEE (1968-2023)

== History ==
In 7 April 2004, the French child Jonathan Coulom was murdered here. Coulom was born in 1994; the exact date of his birth has not been publicly disclosed. On 22 March 2023, the Mayor's house and two of his cars were set on fire. Yannick Morez, mayor of Saint-Brevin, had previously received numerous death threats over the creation of an asylum seekers reception center. On 10 May Yannick Morez resigned, denouncing a "lack of support from the state."

== See also ==
- Communes of the Loire-Atlantique department
