= Marie-Claude Beaud =

French curator (1946–2024)

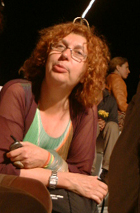
- Beaud in 2001
- Born: 22 February 1946; Besançon, France
- Died: 29 December 2024 (aged 78); Toulon, France
- Education: University of Besançon; University of Grenoble
- Occupations: exhibition curator; director of art institutions
- Employers: MUDAM; New National Museum of Monaco

Marie-Claude Beaud (22 February 1946 – 29 December 2024) was a French exhibition curator and director of art institutions. During her long career, she has held executive positions at Fondation Cartier pour l'Art Contemporain (Paris), Les Arts décoratifs (Paris), MUDAM (Luxembourg), and the New National Museum (Monaco). She was the recipient of several decorations.

== Background ==
Marie-Claude Beaud was born in Besançon, 22 February 1946. Her parents were lawyers. She grew up in Besançon in a modest environment. She worked at odd jobs from her teenage years, first in a pastry shop and then, at the age of 17, as a librarian at the Institut d'Art et d'Archéologie.

She studied at the University of Besançon between 1963 and 1968, where she obtained a degree in art history and archaeology. During these years, she met the art historian Maurice Besset, whose influence convinced her to focus her studies on the history of modern and contemporary art, before doing a diploma of advanced studies in Grenoble.

Beaud died on 29 December 2024, at the age of 78.

== Career ==
At the end of her studies, she was appointed assistant curator at the Museum of Grenoble alongside Besset. At the same time, Beaud taught at the University of Grenoble. In 1975, she became interim director of the Museum of Grenoble as well as curator of the Museum Thierry Raspail, a position she held until 1978. At that time, she brought comic strips into the museum's collections, a revolutionary attitude at the time; it was then pointed out to Beaud that she should "make serious acquisitions".

From 1978 to 1984, she was curator of the Museum of Toulon where she reinterpreted the archaeological and fine arts collections with artists. With the help of artists and teachers, she developed an active educational department in schools and high schools. At the same time, she taught at the School of Art and Architecture in Marseille and at the Aix-Marseille University.

In 1984, she became the founding director of the Fondation Cartier pour l'Art Contemporain, where she set up artist residencies, presented a program of live performances and organized thematic exhibitions, such as the 1990 exhibition on the links between Andy Warhol and The Velvet Underground, the latter reforming for the occasion. In the mid-1980s, she worked with the architect Jean Nouvel on the establishment of the Foundation in a new building on Boulevard Raspail, which opened in 1994, where she launched the multimedia program "Soirées Nomades".

In 1994, she became Executive Director of the American Center in Paris, where she remained for two years until the institution closed. During these few months, she anchored the programming in urban culture by co-producing the electronic music festival Global Tekno with Radio FG.

In February 1997, Beaud was named director of the museums of the Union Centrale des Arts Décoratifs (UCAD) (now, Les Arts décoratifs), which represents the Musée des Arts décoratifs, the Musée Nissim de Camondo, Musée de la mode et du textile, and the Musée de la Publicité.

In January 2000, the Fondation Musée d'Art Moderne Grand-Duc Jean invited Beaud to direct the MUDAM in Luxembourg. As soon as she arrived, she created a scientific committee to advise her on the acquisition of works, increased the number of partnerships with international and national institutions, and initiated, with the artists, a program of commissions open to all fields of creation. Entitled "Be The Artists' Guest", this program quickly became the museum's guiding concept: a living meeting place, designed from the cellar to the attic by the artists. The Mudam, whose building was designed by I. M. Pei, opened its doors in July 2006 with the exhibition "Eldorado". Between her appointment and the opening of the building, she chose to bring the museum to life virtually, with a website designed by the artist Claude Closky, which includes a magazine and a gallery of digital artworks, with contributions from Peter Kogler, Paul Devautour, David Shrigley, Hervé Graumann, Pierre Leguillon, Alexandra Midal, Jean-Charles Massera, among others. In the early 2000s, she was appointed director of the museum.

In the early 2000s, she curated the Venice Biennale for Luxembourg, and won the Golden Lion for the best national participation in the 2003 edition, the first time in history that a pavilion outside the Giardini has been awarded the prize, with the work of the Luxembourg artist Su-Mei Tse. In 2005, H.R.H. Princess Caroline of Hanover asked Beaud to take over the artistic direction of the Prince Pierre Foundation's International Contemporary Art Prize.

From April 2009 till April 2021, Beaud served as the director of the New National Museum of Monaco, consisting of the Villa Paloma and the Villa Sauber.

== Boards and committees ==
- Foundation for Arts Initiatives (FFAI) (formerly, American Center Foundation), New York, USA (Vice-president)
- Fondation Cartier pour l'Art Contemporain, Paris, France
- Villa Noailles, Hyères, France
- Palais de Tokyo, Paris, France
- Boghossian Foundation, Brussels, Belgium
- Prince Pierre of Monaco Foundation, Monaco
- Acquisitions Commission, Louvre Abu Dhabi, Emirates
- Artistic Commission, Byrd Hoffman Water Mill Foundation, New York, USA
- International advisory board, Atopos, Athens, Greece

== Awards and honours ==
- Knight, Ordre des Arts et des Lettres
- Officer, Order of Adolphe of Nassau, 2008
- Commander, Order of the Oak Crown, 2012
- Knight, Legion of Honour, 2015
- Commander, Order of Cultural Merit of Monaco, 2021
