= Robert Calcagno =

Monegasque politician and leader

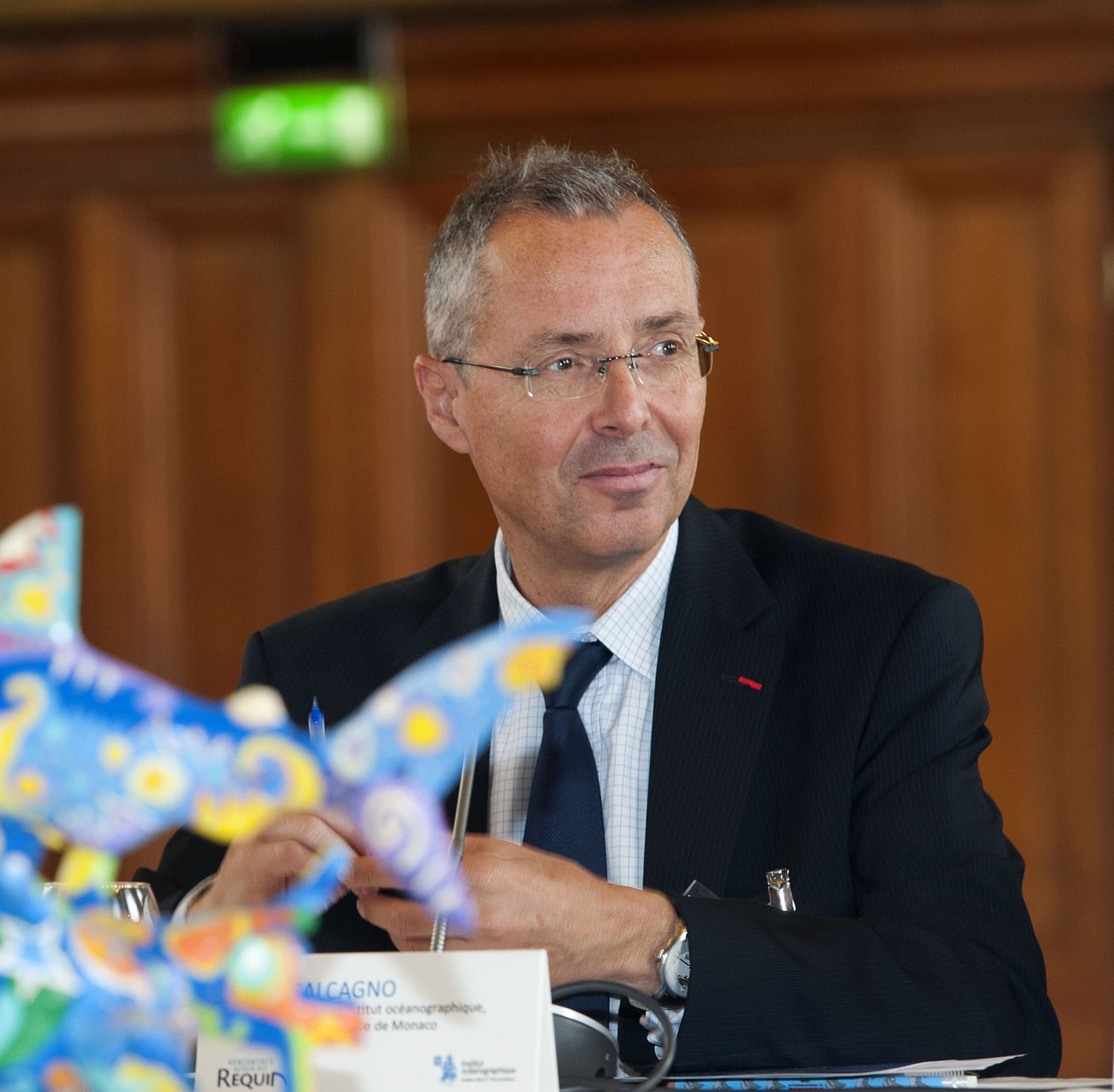

Minister for equipment, environment and urban planning of Monaco
- In office 2006–2009
- Monarch: Albert II

Personal details
- Born: Menton
- Education: École nationale des ponts et chaussées et École polytechnique
- Profession: CEO of the Oceanographic Institute, Foundation Albert I, Prince of Monaco

Robert Calcagno is a Monegasque politician and leader who is CEO of the Oceanographic Institute Foundation Albert I, Prince of Monaco. Calcagno has held ministerial posts in the government of the Principality of Monaco between 2006 and 2009. He now leads the Oceanographic Museum of Monaco and the Maison des océans in Paris His commitment to the protection of the oceans, to a better balance between Humankind and Nature and, on a broader level, his involvement in the economic, social and international life of the Principality of Monaco, have made him one of the key players in the policies of H.S.H. Prince Albert II of Monaco.

== Early life and education ==
Born in Menton, France, Robert Calcagno attended the lycée Albert Premier of Monaco (1970-1978) - also attended by the future Prince Albert II, who is two years his senior. He then transferred to the Lycée Massena in Nice, completing his college studies in 1980.

In the fall of 1980, he enrolled in the prestigious Science and Engineering Institution École polytechnique (1980-1983) et de l'École nationale des ponts et chaussées en 1986 Upon graduation, he furthered his studies, obtaining a civil engineering master's degree in 1986 from the École Nationale des Ponts et Chaussées.

Calcagno also obtained an Executive Master of Business Administration (MBA) degree at Columbia University in New York City.

In 2009, H.S.H. Prince Albert II of Monaco granted him Monegasque nationality.

== Career ==
He made the first of his career as an entrepreneur and investor in different countries (Malaysia, the United States, France, Southeast Asia, and Australia). Engineer, Site Engineer (Dredging and Construction) on the site of the Port of Kuching - Sarawak (Malaysia) for Bouygues (1984-1985), Head of the operational district of the Departmental Directorate of Equipment (DDE) of Loiret and Technical Director Sivom Orléans (1986-1990), Director of Strategy and Development Scetauroute (1991), Managing Director of Scetauroute Development (1992-1995), Managing Director of Transroute Asia Pacific (1995-2000), Managing Director of Egis Group (2000-2003). Later, he became Managing Director of the Nice City Council.

In 2005, Calcagno joined the Cabinet of H.S.H. Prince Albert II of Monaco as Senior Advisor for Economic Affairs and Environment. The following year he was appointed Minister in charge of Public works, Environment and urban development. He undertook projects that included re-urbanisation of former railway right-of-way, initiating new urban development, and the revision of the Environmental Code of Monaco.

In 2009, he became CEO of the Oceanographic Institute Foundation Albert I, Prince of Monaco. He is the Executive Director of the Oceanographic Museum of Monaco and the « Maison des océans » located in Paris.

Upon taking on responsibility of the Oceanographic Museum, Calcagno’s main priority became to accompany restoration to its former glory; in time for the centenary celebrations of the Institution. A new dynamic has been injected into the type of exhibitions currently taking place under his management, including the inauguration of contemporary art exhibits by Damien Hirst, Mark Dion, Huang Yong Ping, and Marc Quinn, among others.

Robert Calcagno was a main proponent for the launching of the Monaco Blue Initiative an international brainstorming platform for the protection of the oceans created in 2010. He made several conferences about marine life, organized by the Museum or otherwise.

2017-2020, he joined the team of Monaco Explorations, a programme of scientific exploration of the oceans lasting 3 years and launched by Prince Albert II. He is Head of this campaign of multidisciplinary missions which associate human and natural sciences, the environment and man. In this capacity he has participated in the missions in Palau, 26 on the Tubbataha Reef, in Cape Verde and on Malpelo Island off Colombia.

== Board membership and honours ==
Among other responsibilities, Robert Calcagno is a member of the Board of Directors of the Prince Albert II of Monaco Foundation, of the Mercantour National Park; as well as Director of Monaco Inter Expo, and of the commission of the Strategic Attractiveness Council. He is a member of the Advisory Board of the Ocean Acidification International

Coordination Centre (OA-ICC) at the International Atomic Energy Agency (IAEA). He is the Chairman of the Quality of Life Commission of the Strategic Council for Attractiveness of Monaco.

On 13 July 2007, he received the Knight Medal by the French National Order of the Legion of Honour.

On 7 November 2014, he was made a Knight of the Order of Saint Charles.

On 29 March 2016, he was promoted to the rank of Officer of Maritime Merit in France.

== Conferences and lectures ==
Sharks: Beyond the misunderstanding, Maison des océans in Paris, January 2013

The importance of the oceans in climate change: mitigation measures, Panellist, World Ocean Conference in Manado, Indonesia, 13 May 2009

Oceans, climate change and the public: mobilising the public and the private sector for action, Panellist, World Ocean Conference in Manado, Indonesia, 12 May 2009

Managing our planet’s blue heart, Speaker, Global Policy and Sustainability at the International University of Monaco, 3 June 2013

== Publications ==
- Face à face avec les méduses : les connaître et s’en protéger - Paris; Monaco : Institut océanographique, 2009. ISBN 978-2-903581-62-6
- Méditerranée : splendide, fragile, vivante / Robert Calcagno, André Giordan. – Monaco : Éditions du Rocher, 2010. ISBN 978-2-26807-012-4
- Cornucopia / Damien Hirst; préface de Marie-Claude Beaud et Robert Calcagno. – London : Other Criteria; Monaco : Musée océanographique, 2010. ISBN 978-1-906967-31-4
- Face à face avec les algues de Méditerranée - Paris; Monaco : Institut océanographique, 2010. ISBN 978-2-903581-81-7
- L’histoire du mariage princier, avec Stéphane Bern, éd. Éditions du Rocher, 2011, ISBN 2268072185
- Les grands fonds marins, voyage dans un monde inconnu, ed. du Rocher, 2011, ISBN 978-2268071879
- Requins, Au-delà du malentendu, éd. Éditions du Rocher, 2013, ISBN 978-2-268-07472-6
- Méduses, à la conquête des océans, éd. Editions du Rocher, 2014, ISBN 978-2-268-07598-3
