= Darío Escobar =

Guatemalan artist (born 1971)

- Born: 1971 (age 54–55); Guatemala City, Guatemala
- Known for: Contemporary art

Untitled (McDonald's Cup) by Darío Escobar, 1999, cardboard, plastic, gold and pigments

Darío Escobar (born 1971, Guatemala City) is a Guatemalan artist.

His work is characterized by the investigation of formal and conceptual aspects of objects and their function in visual arts.

== Select one-person exhibitions ==
2016

- "Dario Escobar: Composições", Casa Triângulo, Sao Paulo, Brazil.

2015

- "En otro orden", the 9.99 gallery, Guatemala City, Guatemala.

2014

- Unions & Intersections, Nils Stærk Gallery, Copenhagen, Denmark.
- Broken circle, CAFAM Museum, Los Angeles, California

2013

- Pintura abstracta No. 7 / Abstract Painting No. 7, González & González, Santiago de Chile.
- Untitled, kamel mennour Galerie, Paris.
- Dario Escobar / Blacksmith Paintings, Josée Bienvenu Gallery, New York.
- Dario Escobar / Línea & Espacio, ArteCentro, Ciudad de Guatemala, Guatemala.

2012

- Dario Escobar (MAC) Museo de arte Contemporáneo de Santiago, Santiago, Chile.
- Dario Escobar: Singular Plural. SCAD Savannah - SCAD Museum of Art, Savannah, Georgia
- Dario Escobar: Singular Plural. SCAD Atlanta - Gallery 1600, Atlanta, Georgia
- Dario Escobar / trabajo reciente Baró Galeria, São Paulo, Brazil.

2011

- Dario Escobar / Revisión Museo Nacional de Arte Moderno Carlos Mérida, Guatemala City, Guatemala.

2010

- Side and Back, kamel mennour, Paris
- Anverso y Reverso, González y González, Santiago, Chile.

2008

- Playoffs, Josee Bienvenu Gallery, New York, New York.

2007

- La Línea Interrumpida, (CCM) Centro Cultural Metropolitano, Guatemala City, Guatemala.
- Dario Escobar/Project room, Rotunda Gallery, Brooklyn, New York.

2006

- Objetos en Transito, Sala Gasco, Santiago, Chile.

2005

- Serpentario, (CCEG) Centro Cultural de España Guatemala, Guatemala City, Guatemala.

2004

- Out! Galería Jacobo Karpio, Miami, Florida.

2003

- Espacios provisionales (MADC) Museo de Arte y Diseño Contemporáneo, San José, Costa Rica.
- Visual Entertainments, Museo de Arte Moderno de Mérida, Mérida, Mexico.

2001

- Dario Escobar, Trabajo reciente. Galería Jocobo Karpio, San José, Costa Rica.

2000

- Dario Escobar: Selección, II National Biennial of Lima, Peru.

== Select group exhibitions ==
2016

- "FOOT FORAINE”, Gare Saint Sauveur, Lille, France.
- “GAME ON!” (CMA) Children's Museum of the Arts, New York.
- "Colección MAC. Obras Latinoamericanas”, Museo de arte Contemporáneo de Santiago, Santiago de Chile, Chile.

2015

- "...Pero no soy fotógrafo” The 9.99 Gallery, Guatemala.
- “10ª Bienal do Mercosul" Porto Alegre, Brazil.
- “Gold", Neuberger Museum of Art Purchase College, Purchase, New York.
- “Coleccion Daros Latinamerica”, Fundación PROA, Buenos Aires.
- “Líneas de la Mano”, Sicardi Gallery, Houston, TX''
- 5 - RPM (Revoluciones por minuto)”, the 9.99 gallery, Guatemala city, Guatemala.
- Beleza?”, Centro Cultural São Paulo, Brazil.

2014

- Largo x Ancho x Alto / Height x Width x Depth”, the 9.99 gallery, Guatemala city, Guatemala.
- El día que nos hicimos contemporáneos" (MADC) Museo de arte y diseño, San José, Costa Rica.
- Gold”, Bass Museum of Art, Miami, Florida
- Fútbol: the beautiful game”, (LACMA) Los Angeles County Museum of Art, Los Angeles, California.
- Deslize", Openning of (MAR) Museu de Arte do Rio, Rio de Janeiro.

2013

- Confusion in the vault", Museo Jumex, México D.F.''
- Inaugural Exhibition”, the Pizzuti Collection, Columbus, Ohio.
- California-Pacific Triennial”, (OCMA) Orange County Museum of Art, Newport Beach, California / (CCC) Coastline Community College Art Gallery, Newport Beach, California.
- y... ¿entonces? / and... so?”, the 9.99, Guatemala City, Guatemala.
- The Collaborative: Question in the line” (MOLAA) Museum of Latin American Art, Long Beach, California.

2012

- Futbol. Arte y pasión”, (MARCO) Museo de Arte Contemporáneo de Monterrey, Monterrey, México.
- The Island / A game of life”, Gallery One, Manarat al Saadiyat, Abu Dhabi.
- Play with me”, (MOLAA) Museum of Latin American Art, Long Beach, California.

2011

- Now Selected works from the Jumex Collection, Instituto Cultural Cabañas, Guadalajara, Mexico.
- Video otra vez, Museo de Arte Contemporáneo de Fortaleza, Fortaleza, Brazil.
- Proyecto ideal, Centro Cultural de São Paulo, São Paulo, Brazil.
- From the Recent Past: New Acquisitions, (MOCA) The Museum of Contemporary Art, Los Angeles, California.

2010

- Chapter II: Ruido, 9.99/proyecto, Guatemala City, Guatemala.
- Proyecto Ideal, (MAC) Museo de arte Contemporáneo de Santiago, Santiago, Chile.
- Optimismo Radical, Josee Bienvenu Gallery, New York, New York.
- XVII Bienal de Guatemala, (CCM) Centro Cultural Metropolitano, Guatemala City, Guatemala.
- Efecto Drácula, Museo Universitario del CHOPO, Mexico City, Mexico.
- Social Affects: A selection from the permanent Collection of the David Rockefeller Center for Latin America Studies/ Harvard University. Boston Center for the arts/ Mills Gallery, Boston, Massachusetts.
- Four Views from the Permanent Collection exhibition (MOLAA) Museum of Latin American Art, Long Beach, California.

2009

- Los impoliticos, (PAN) Palazzo delle Arti Napoli, Naples, Italy.
- 10 Springs in the fall, kamel mennour, Paris.
- Périfériks, (CAN) Centre d’art Neuchâtel, Neuchâtel, Switzerland.
- Mundus Novus: 53 Bienal Internacional de Venecia, Artiglerie dell’Arsenale, Venice, Italy.
- 0.3333333333333333…, 9.99/proyecto, Guatemala City, Guatemala.
- La nada y el ser, Septima interpretación de La Colección Jumex, La Colección Jumex, Ecatepec, Mexico City, Mexico.
- Video otra vez, Metales Pesados, Santiago de Chile, Chile.
- Performing Localities, (INIVA) Institute of International Visual Arts, London, England.
- X Bienal de La Habana, Fortaleza de San Carlos de la Cabaña, Havana, Cuba.

2008

- La invención de lo cotidiano, (MUNAL) Museo Nacional de Arte, Mexico City, Mexico.
- Object of Value, (MAC -MAM) Miami Art Central, Miami, Florida.
- Playtime, Bétonsalon/ Centre d’art et de recherche, Paris, France.
- World Histories, Des Moines Art Center, Des Moines, Iowa.
- Visions From Abroad, Flushing Town Hall, New York, New York.
- Elefante negro, Museo Diego Rivera, Mexico City, Mexico.

2007

- Fortunate Object, (CIFO) Cisneros Fontanalls Art Foundations, Miami, Florida.
- Silence & Echo, Arena 1, Santa Monica, California.
- The Hours: Visual Arts of Contemporary Latin America, Museum of Contemporary Art, Sydney, Australia.
- Poetics of the Handmade The Museum of Contemporary Art (MOCA), Los Angeles, California.

2006

- El esquiador en el fondo del pozo, Quinta interpretación de La Colección Jumex, La Colección Jumex, Ecatepec, Mexico City, Mexico.
- Stil Biuti, Centro de Arte Contemporáneo Zamek Ujazdowski, Warsaw, Poland.
- The Beautiful Game: Contemporary Art and Fútbol, (BAM) Brooklyn Academy of Music, Brooklyn, New York.
- Constant Disturbance, The Spanish Cultural Center, Miami, Florida.

2005

- The Hours. Visual Arts of Contemporary Latin America, Dublin Museum, Ireland
- Living for the city Jack Shainman Gallery, New York, New York / (CIEL) CentreInternational d’Expositions de Larouche, Toronto, Canada.

2004

- Newspapers, Josee Bienvenu Gallery, New York, New York.

2003

- Intangible, (MADC) Museo de Arte y Diseño Contemporáneo, San José, Costa Rica.
- LA Freeways: Latin America, (MOCA) The Museum of Contemporary Art, Los Angeles, California / America's Society, New York, New York (2004).
- RAIN Project, Pabellón Cuba, Havana, Cuba.
- Stretch, The Power Plant, Toronto, Canada.
- TransEAT , Food Culture Museum, Miami, Florida.
- VIII Bienal de la Habana, Centro Wifredo Lam, Havana, Cuba.

2002

- ART itsmo, (MADC) Museo de Arte y Diseño Contemporáneo, San José, Costa Rica.
- Contaminados, (MADC) Museo de Arte y Diseño Contemporáneo, San José, Costa Rica.
- Del centro a la isla, Casa de las Américas, Havana, Cuba.
- Intimate/Universal, Ateneo de Caracas, Caracas, Venezuela.
- Mesoamérica: Oscilaciones y Artificios, (CAAM) Centro Atlántico de Arte Moderno, Canary Islands, Spain.
- Zones in Tension, de GANG Gallery, Harlem, the Netherlands.

2001

- Continuous Connection, Felissimo Project, New York, New York.
- Short Stories, La Fabbrica del Vapore, Milan, Italy.
- Spaces/Bodies/Identities, Centro Cultural de España, San José, Costa Rica.
- 13 Hours, Sala Mendoza, Caracas, Venezuela.
- I Tirana Biennial, National Gallery & Chinese Pavilion, Tirana, Albania.
- IV Caribbean Biennial, Museo de Arte Moderno, Santo Domingo, Dominican Republic.
- Barro de América IV Biennial, Museo de Arte Contemporáneo Sofía Imber, Caracas, Venezuela.

2000

- 2eme. Biennale du Design 2000, Ecole des Beaux Arts de Saint-Etienne, Saint-Etienne, France.
- L’ art dans le monde, Pont Alexandre III, Paris, France.

1999

- Guatemalan Art, Sala Oficial Juan Ismael del Cabildo de Fuerteventura, Canary Islands, Spain.
- II Iberoamerican Biennial of Lima, Lima, Peru.

1998

- Fotojornada’98, Museo Nacional de Arte Moderno Carlos Mérida, Guatemala City, Guatemala.
- Without Title, Plaza G&T; Guatemala City, Guatemala.
- I Central American Biennale, Centro Cultural Miguel Angel Asturias, Guatemala City, Guatemala / (DUMA) Duke University Museum of Art, North Carolina.
- VI International Art Biennale of Cuenca, Cuenca, Ecuador.

1997

- La Joven Estampa, Casa de las Américas, Havana, Cuba.

== Lectures ==
- Dario Escobar Lecture: The Experience of the Object. Events Space, SCAD Atlanta, Georgia. February, 2012
- Uno a Uno: Darío Escobar y José Falconí. [One on One: Darío Escobar and José Falconí] Auditorium AFP Integra at the Museum of Art of Lima MALI. Lima, Peru. May 2011
- Artist on Their Art Series: Darío Escobar. David Rockefeller Center for Latin American Studies (DRCLAS) Harvard University. November, 2010
- Mirar de Nuevo: El objeto reconsiderado. [Look again: the reconsidered object] National School of Fine Arts (ENAP), Guatemala, Guatemala. April 2010.
- Work and recent projects panel with Sara Reisman, Americas Society / Pinta New York. November, 2009.
- Darío Escobar: Cátedra y crítica magistral. [Darío Escobar: magisterial class and critic] New Amphitheater of the Hospital de la Concepción building, School of Fine Arts. Old San Juan, Puerto Rico. November, 2003.
