= Kamel Mennour =

Algerian-French art dealer

Kamel Mennour (born October 1965) is an Algerian-born French art dealer, owner of Galerie Kamel Mennour in Paris.

Founded in 1999, Galerie Kamel Mennour opened its third exhibition space in Paris in 2015.

In 2016, he was included in Artnet's list of "Europe's 10 Most Respected Art Dealers".

In 2016, Mennour opened a gallery at 51 Brook Street in London's Mayfair, next to Claridge's Hotel.
