= Fortunato Calcagno =

Italian politician

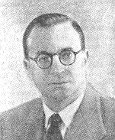

Member of the Chamber of Deputies
- In office 8 May 1948 – 25 June 1953
- Constituency: Sicily (Catania)

Personal details
- Born: 9 July 1900 Ramacca, Italy
- Died: 31 March 1966 (aged 65) Catania, Italy
- Party: Christian Democracy
- Education: University of Catania
- Profession: Lawyer

Fortunato Calcagno (9 July 1900 - 31 March 1966) was an Italian lawyer, politician and officer.

== Biography ==
He was born in Ramacca in 1900; he graduated in law from the University of Catania. Elected in the first legislature, he represented Christian Democracy party in the Chamber of Deputies; he was mayor of Ramacca, president of the Sicilian Editorial and director of the Sicilian Electricity Authority. In October 1950, a consortium of entrepreneurs headed by The Hon. Calcagno took over the Corriere di Sicilia, a newspaper founded in 1943 by the anti-fascist journalist Giuseppe Longhitano and the former mayor of Catania Carlo Ardizzoni.
