= Francesco Calcagno =

Claimed Jesus was homosexual (1528–1550)

Francesco Calcagno (Brescia, 1 February 1528 – Brescia, 23 December 1550) was a young Italian Friar Minor who was accused of blasphemy and both practising and promoting sodomy by the Venetian Inquisition. He justified this by claiming that Jesus Christ had been in a homosexual relationship. After being convicted of these charges, he was executed for them.

== Calcagno and the Venetian Inquisition ==
Initially laicized and expelled from the order of Franciscans for his rebellious attitude and beliefs, Calcagno nevertheless continued to parody the Catholic Church and its beliefs, and to celebrate the Mass in spite of being forbidden from doing so.

At the age of 22, he was interrogated in Brescia on 15 July 1550 after an investigation by the Holy Office of the Venetian Inquisition relating to the offences of atheistic blasphemy and sodomy.

A witness familiar with Calcagno testified that the Franciscan slept with a boy almost every night, believed that Jesus engaged in sodomy with St. John, and denied the existence of God and Paradise, as well as the immortality of the human soul.

Calcagno admitted his guilt and mentioned that he had once talked to a certain Mr. Lauro di Glisenti da Vestone, an atheist who "said he didn't believe in anything, only what you could see with your eyes", and replied "Well then you can believe or say anything you want about Christ no matter how bad, like that he kept Saint John as his boy." He also argued that Paul the Apostle had condemned sodomy in his writings because he enjoyed the practice and wanted to keep it to himself. Calcagno also told the inquisitors that he had been influenced in his opinions by La cazzaria, a homoerotic 1530 dialogue by Antonio Vignali that was discreetly (but widely) circulated at the time.

The report of the Brescian Tribunal was forwarded to the Council of Ten and Calcagno was executed in Venice on 23 December 1550.
