= Musée de la Publicité =

Advertising history museum in Paris, France

Coordinates: 48°51′47″N 2°20′0″E

The Musée de la Publicité (French pronunciation: [myze də la pyblisite]) was a museum of advertising history located in the Louvre Palace's Rohan and Marsan wings, 1st arrondissement of Paris, at 107, rue de Rivoli, Paris, France.

The museum first opened in 1978 as the Musée de l’Affiche, and is now a department of the Musée des Arts Décoratifs, Paris. Works from the former museum are regularly displayed in temporary exhibitions.

== Collections ==
The museum focused on advertisements. It contained about 50,000 posters dating between the 18th century and World War II, with a further 50,000 posters dating from the 1950s to the present, over 20,000 film advertisements, more than 30,000 newspaper and magazine advertisements, as well as radio advertisements and promotional items.

== See also ==
- List of museums in Paris
