= Fase =

Contemporary dance choreography

Song by Steve Reich
- Published: 1981-1982
- Studio: Bourse Theater, Brussels, Belgium
- Genre: Contemporary dance
- Length: Around 50 minutes

Fase, Four Movements to the Music of Steve Reich is a contemporary dance choreography by Belgian choreographer Anne Teresa De Keersmaeker, created in 1982 for two dancers to the phase music compositions of Steve Reich. Fase is De Keersmaeker's second composition, which she began working on in 1980 during her stay in the United States and completed upon her return to Brussels the following year. The full version premiered in Brussels on March 18, 1982, at the Bourse Theater (Beursschouwburg). This work is considered a landmark piece in De Keersmaeker's career and a major choreography in the global contemporary dance scene.

This piece consists of four distinct movements made up of three duets and one solo, directly named after four works by Steve Reich — Piano Phase (1967), Violin Phase (1967), Come Out (1966), and Clapping Music (1972) — each of which can be performed independently or in combination. De Keersmaeker danced the piece for years alongside her collaborator Michèle Anne De Mey. In 1999, she received a Bessie Award in New York for this choreography. Fase has been regularly performed for nearly 40 years as part of various cultural events and festivals worldwide, with over 200 performances. This piece marks the renewal of the close relationship between dance and music that De Keersmaeker would develop throughout her career. Its immediate success also led to the foundation of the Rosas company in Brussels in 1983.

== History ==
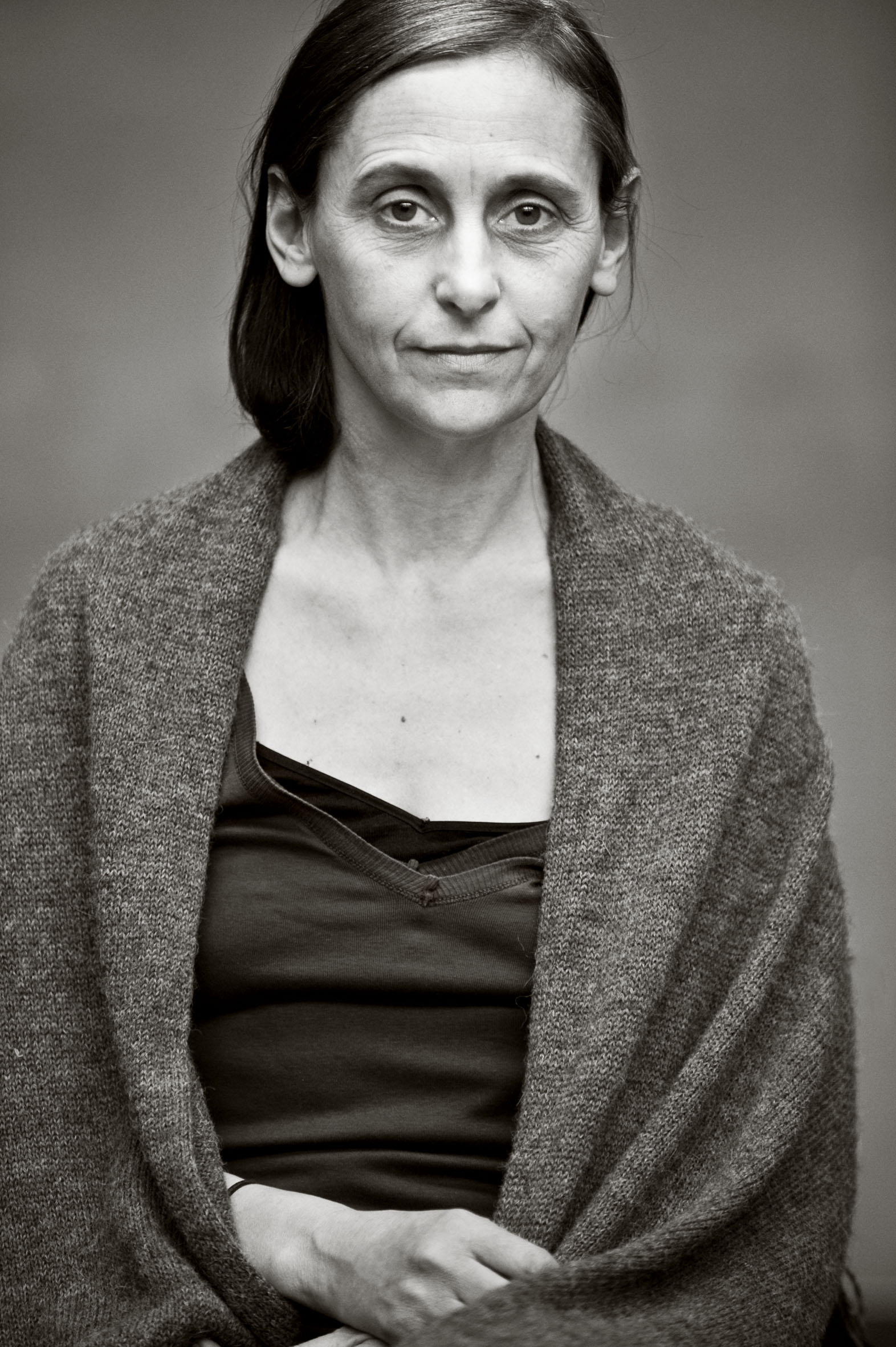
Anne Teresa De Keersmaeker

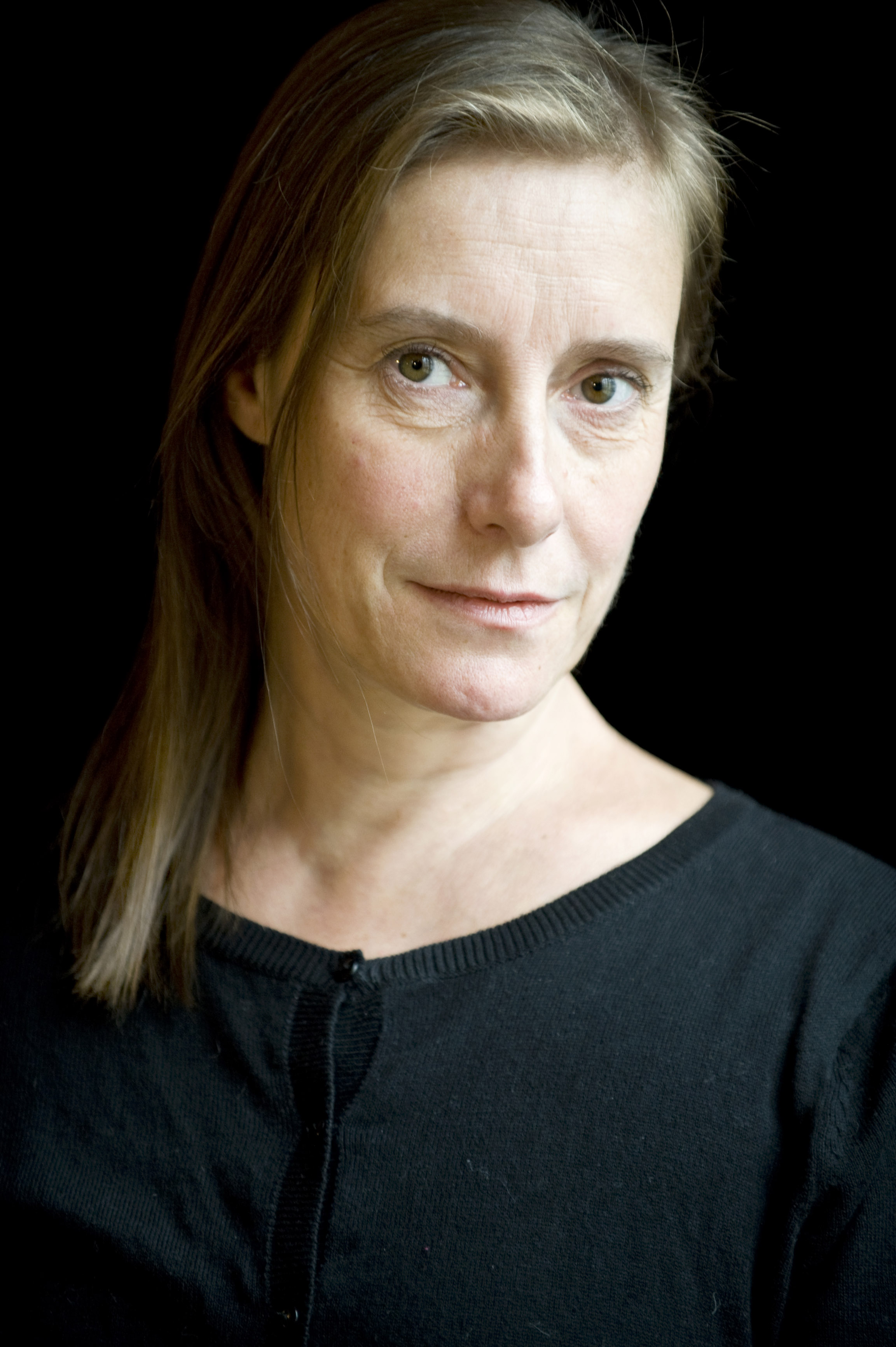
Michèle Anne De Mey

Following Asch, De Keersmaeker's first work in 1980, the Fase ensemble became the young Flemish artist's second choreography. It consists of four movements composed at two different times and places. Violin Phase and Come Out were created in the United States in 1981 as part of De Keersmaeker's studies at the Tisch School of the Arts at New York University (NYU) from 1980 until the end of 1981. Meanwhile, Piano Phase and Clapping Music were conceived after her return to Brussels in January 1982. Rehearsals for the entire set were conducted with Michèle Anne De Mey, (Note: Anne Teresa De Keersmaeker met Michèle Anne De Mey, and consequently her brother Thierry De Mey, at the Lilian Lambert School in Brussels. Both would later continue their studies at the Mudra School founded by Maurice Béjart in the Belgian capital.) who participated in the creation during rehearsals with De Keersmaeker at the studio of the Trojaanse Paard company led by Jan Decorte in Schaerbeek. The premiere of Fase, Four Movements to the Music of Steve Reich took place on March 18, 1982, at the Bourse Theater in Brussels. The piece was performed in various Flemish cultural centers that year with the support of Hugo De Greef. The immediate success of Fase and De Keersmaeker's international recognition was confirmed in 1983 during the Dance Umbrella Festival in London and later at the Centre Pompidou in Paris. Between 1982 and 1985, Fase was performed over 100 times, solidifying the choreographer's career in Europe.

Danced for many years by the duo of Anne Teresa De Keersmaeker and Michèle Anne De Mey, who were invited to perform at international festivals, Fase performances were halted between 1985 and 1992, as De Keersmaeker decided to stop performing the piece. Driven by a renewed desire to dance, after having distanced herself from the stage to focus solely on choreography, De Keersmaeker occasionally revived Fase starting in 1992, partnering with a different dancer, Tale Dolven, for the duets. The success of Fase greatly contributed to the creation of the Rosas company in 1983. The importance of this piece and the growing recognition of the company led to Fase being performed in 1985 with members of Steve Reich and Musicians, who provided live music during the finale of the international tour that had begun in 1982.

Steve Reich granted permission for the use of his compositions in 1982 while De Keersmaeker was working in New York with three members of the Steve Reich Ensemble (Edmund Niemann and Nurit Tilles on piano, and Shem Guibbory on violin), who performed the music live on stage with the company for two years. Reich did not see Fase until 1998 when the work returned to The Kitchen in New York. He wrote about this experience:

It was only in 1998 that I had the opportunity to discover Fase, the masterpiece she had developed at the time. Never had I seen such a choreographic revelation based on my work. She had completely understood the essence of my early compositions. He went so far as to say that Anne Teresa De Keersmaeker’s work "was all analogous to the music. On an emotional and psychological level I felt I’d learned something about my own work."

Reich insisted on including Fase the following year at the Lincoln Center Festival during a retrospective dedicated to his work. On this occasion, Anne Teresa De Keersmaeker received a second Bessie Award: “To reward the grand unified theory of number and dance, the full blossoming of intellectual rigor and musical sensibility, the burning desire of the embodied body and spirit across the twenty-year history of Rosas, and most emblematically in its foundational atom, Fase.” As a tribute, Fase, performed at the Brooklyn Academy of Music in October 2006, inaugurated New York City's celebration of Steve Reich's 70th birthday during the Steve Reich @ 70 festival. The Piano Fase section, danced by Cynthia Loemij and Tale Dolven, was incorporated into the creation of Steve Reich Evening and performed in numerous cities worldwide between 2006 and 2008. From January 12 to 16, 2011, the Violin Fase section was once again performed by Anne Teresa De Keersmaeker at the Museum of Modern Art in New York as part of the Performance Exhibition Series, which explored the theme of tracing in 20th-century art. In March of the same year, the full Fase ensemble was danced by Anne Teresa De Keersmaeker and Cynthia Loemij as part of a repertoire cycle organized by the Kaaitheater, which included four of the choreographer's foundational pieces. The work was performed again in July for three shows alongside the premiere of Cesena during the Avignon Festival, this time with Tale Dolven as her partner. Anne Teresa De Keersmaeker, then 54 years old, and Tale Dolven performed the piece once more in July 2014 during a cycle dedicated to the choreographer at New York's Lincoln Center Festival.

Starting in September 2018, during a retrospective of eleven pieces from the Rosas company's repertoire presented as part of the Festival d'Automne in Paris, Fase was passed on to two new pairs of dancers: Yuika Hashimoto and Laura Maria Poletti, or Laura Bachman and Soa Ratsifandrihana. They performed in various locations across Île-de-France and later embarked on new world tours featuring this work, which had entered the company's repertoire and become a cornerstone of contemporary dance. Notable changes in interpretation were introduced in certain movements of Fase, primarily due to the unique characteristics of the performers. This marked the first time in thirty-seven years that Anne Teresa De Keersmaeker did not dance in Fase, particularly in the Violin Fase solo, which she had always performed herself. While she did not rule out the possibility of dancing it again, she expressed that it was time to pass this piece on to a younger generation.

== General presentation ==
Fase is a work in four movements: (Note: Note that while Fase is generally performed in this order, the second and third movements are also frequently switched during certain performances.)

1. Piano Phase;
2. Violin Phase;
3. Come Out;
4. Clapping Music.

It consists of three duets in the form of pas de deux and one solo (Violin Phase), which can be performed separately or partially but constitute a coherent whole. Its total duration is approximately 50 minutes. The work is closely linked to the phase music of Steve Reich, which De Keersmaeker discovered in New York between 1980 and 1982 during her studies at NYU, and which has since become "the traveling companion and anchor point" for the choreographer. Like the music it accompanies, the fundamental principle of Fase is a stripped-down, even austere, choreographic structure—extremely rigorous, mathematical, and geometric, alternating between the use of the circle and the straight line. The choreographer herself acknowledges that the piece is "radical," based on exploring what her body wanted to express at the time with a sort of "non-know-how."

Fase consists of repetitive cycles of simple movements that play on the physically demanding task of maintaining rhythm and the logic of phase-shifting/re-aligning during the duets. (Note: "Fase is a piece where space and the relationship with music are explored in an almost mathematical way. At the same time, it is done with immense physical and emotional intensity, in an abstract rigor based on logic," De Keersmaeker said during the presentation of the piece at Usine C in Montreal in January 2008.) Although it employs so-called "minimalist" writing, the movement is expansive and evolving, utilizing variations around a central motif, and is technically extremely challenging to maintain. (Note: The dancer Cynthia Loemij describes Fase as "emotionally exhausting" due to the constant need to count the execution of minimalist cells and the essential geometric understanding of the piece, which demands great "self-control" (Guisgand 2008, p. 60).) The work draws significant inspiration from two sources: the accumulation processes of Trisha Brown, whom De Keersmaeker admires, and the work of Lucinda Childs, who collaborated closely with the New York minimalist school in the 1960s and 1970s within the Judson Dance Theater. Childs notably worked with composer Philip Glass and visual artist Sol LeWitt, who respectively created the score and the scenography/video for one of Childs' most significant works, Dance, which premiered at the Brooklyn Academy of Music in 1979. This piece, particularly its first two movements, inspired De Keersmaeker in composing the Violin Phase and Piano Phase sections, which share similar stylistic foundations, stripped-down techniques (arm and leg throws, repeated movements), and some choreographic principles (shifts, use of circles and straight lines). However, De Keersmaeker's proposal pushes these elements to the extreme, particularly due to Reich's music, which is more theoretical and radical than Glass's in its repetitive motifs and phase-shifting principles.

Lighting, designed by Remon Fromont and Mark Schwentner, is an essential part of Fase's staging, as it highlights and accentuates the phase-shifting processes. The overlapping shadows created during the first movement give the impression that the dancers number five or six instead of just two, reminiscent of Sol LeWitt's projected video use in Dance. Additionally, the simple, almost austere costumes—small, swirling gray and mauve dresses with white socks and childlike sneakers in the first two movements, followed by tight pants and shirts in the latter—also became a signature element of De Keersmaeker's visual identity for many years.

=== First movement: Piano Phase ===
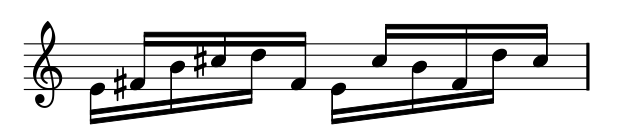
Main musical motif of twelve notes from Piano Phase (1967) by Steve Reich.

Written upon her return to Brussels in 1982, this is probably the most famous and frequently independently performed part of the work. It is also considered one of the most spectacular, as it is certainly the most visual due to the play of shadows that multiplies the dancers' figures. In this first part, De Keersmaeker introduces the foundations of her repetitive dance and reveals the process of phasing/dephasing inherent in Steve Reich's famous Piano Phase, composed in 1967. The two dancers, powerfully lit by four lateral spotlights that create individual and overlapping shadows against a white background, repeat for about 15 minutes a swinging arm and body movement, combined with a sudden and vigorous half-turn, punctuated by a rise onto a pointed foot held in suspension before resuming the sequence. Following the music and its phase-shifting principle, one of the dancers accelerates her movement by a twelfth of a phase, thereby shifting her sequence relative to her partner until reaching phase opposition, followed by a complete rephasing after a few minutes. The two dancers remain aligned on the same plane but gradually and imperceptibly move toward the front of the stage, creating a diagonal shift (including two transitions to a plane perpendicular to the initial one, facing the audience). They continue their sequence on this new plane before returning to the initial plane at the end of the musical work, once again finding the synchronicity from the piece's beginning.

=== Second movement: Violin Phase ===
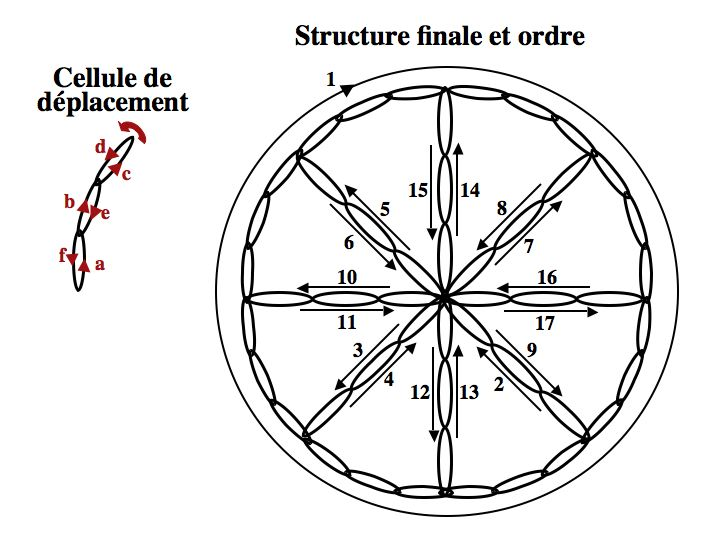
Schematic representation of the resulting rosette pattern, the direction of movement, and the order of execution of the Violin Phase movements.

This is the solo of the ensemble, danced by Anne Teresa De Keersmaeker—this time within a spinning circle lit from above—to Violin Phase, a piece composed by Steve Reich in 1967. This part, lasting about 18 minutes, was the first written by the choreographer and was performed in April 1981 at the Festival of the Early Years at the State University of New York (SUNY) at Purchase. It is directly inspired by the second movement of Dance (1979) by Lucinda Childs. Anne Teresa De Keersmaeker also employs a pirouette motif similar to that in Piano Phase, rigorously connecting the various cardinal points of the imaginary circle around which the dancer moves, alternating between centrifugal and centripetal patterns. Only the purity of the gesture and body movements are showcased, drawing a fictitious eight-segment rosette on the floor with the tip of the dancer's foot. This is explicitly depicted in the drawings in the sand traced by Anne Teresa De Keersmaeker in Thierry De Mey's 2002 video or during performances at MoMA in New York in 2011, which reprised this setup on stage for pedagogical purposes around the theme of "the line in the 20th century." The movement culminates in a musical and choreographic climax about two-thirds into the piece with a triple swinging motion performed by the dancer at the center of the circle with her right leg while balancing on the immobile left leg. She then repeats this movement more briefly at the four cardinal points. The rotation of the figures and the dancer, amplified by the swirling light dress, references both the spiritual and physical circumambulation of the Samā‘ dance of Sufi whirling dervishes and the playful childhood dances of little girls twirling their dresses at village balls. Some movements from this part became typical motifs and signatures in the choreographer's later works, such as the use of the spiral, which she considers "the absolute movement" (Note: When asked, "What would be the absolute movement for you?" Anne Teresa De Keersmaeker responded, "Two opposing spirals, DNA," (Boisseau 2006, p. 302)) and which academic Philippe Guisgand describes as a "major spatial obsession of De Keersmaeker." De Keersmaeker herself confirmed this idea in 2002 when she stated about her entire body of work:

Violin Phase is the core that contained everything that followed.

In this movement, Anne Teresa De Keersmaeker demonstrates that music cannot be a mere accompaniment to dance. For her, the work involves addressing an essential aspect of musical composition and making it a foundation of her choreographic grammar, whether through the use of space, time, or gesture itself. Thus, the Violin Phase score, structured in the rondo form, implies, by literal transposition, the use of the circle for choreographic composition.

=== Third movement: Come Out ===
This movement, lasting about 11 minutes, was created with Jennifer Everhard, a fellow student of Anne Teresa De Keersmaeker, and was first performed independently in October 1981 at the Tisch School of the Arts at NYU. Under two suspended lamps, the dancers, now dressed in gray pants, light-colored shirts, and boots, remain seated on stools. They repeat seven distinct arm and torso movements without standing, in an extremely jerky and chaotic manner. Gradually, they turn to the rhythm of the recorded phrase “Come out to show them” from Come Out, Steve Reich's second composition, written in 1966. This part is a fairly figurative representation of the historical context surrounding Reich's composition, created in response to riots by the African-American community advocating for civil rights. Notably, the dancers' movements mimic the initial phrase: “I had to, like, open the bruise up and let some of the bruise blood come out to show them.” (Note: Referring to the lack of care given to Daniel Hamm by the police, who were convinced of self-inflicted injuries and considered the wounds insignificant.) The sequence is performed under the harsh light of two bare lamps, evoking the atmosphere of a brutal police interrogation.

This movement would later serve as the foundational work for the second movement of Rosas danst Rosas, Anne Teresa De Keersmaeker's subsequent choreography written in 1983.

=== Fourth movement: Clapping Music ===
Also written upon her return to Brussels in 1982, this final movement involves the dancers moving diagonally from upstage right to downstage left, passing vertically under the two lamps used in Come Out, where the movement concludes. The choreography is based on a simple synchronous/asynchronous motion of their feet, shifting from demi-pointe to flat feet on the floor, accompanied by sudden knee flexion under tension, paired with opposing half-bent arm movements. The sequence lasts 4 to 5 minutes and follows the twelve phases of hand-clapping shifts from Clapping Music (1972), performed live by two people.

== Videography of Fase ==
Although many of Anne Teresa De Keersmaeker's pieces had previously been filmed, (Note: Notably Hoppla! (1989) by Wolfgang Kolb, Rosa (1992) by Peter Greenaway, and Rosas danst Rosas (1997) by Thierry De Mey.) the full video of Fase — a 12-minute short film by Eric Pauwels from 1983 had only captured the Violin Phase section — was not created until 2002, on the occasion of the 20th anniversary of the founding of the Rosas company. Designed by Thierry De Mey, this version approaches the piece differently from the stage performance without replacing it. It was filmed in various locations: in the Rosas company rehearsal studios in Forest for Piano Phase, the Coca-Cola building in Anderlecht for Come Out, the Tervuren arboretum for Violin Phase, and the Felix Pakhuis in Antwerp for Clapping Music. The film explicitly highlights the geometric elements of the choreographer's creations, particularly in Violin Phase. For this purpose, this section was filmed outdoors on a circular, elevated stage covered in white sand. As Anne Teresa De Keersmaeker dances, she traces lines with the tips of her feet, visualizing on the ground the circle in which her choreography unfolds, dividing it into four and then eight equal parts, and gradually creating undulations and crenellations along the lines, forming a rose (or lotus flower) — a symbolic reference to the name of her company. The dancer's repeated trajectories gradually erase and redraw these patterns, thus playing with temporality and space in sync with Reich's composition.

== Critical reception ==
Over the past forty years, Fase has been performed more than 200 times worldwide, (Note: More than 160 performances from 1982 to 2014 (Guisgand 2008, p. 23), in addition to those of the 2018 revival, which led to a new cycle of worldwide tours over several years.) making it one of the most frequently danced pieces in contemporary dance and an exceptional international critical success, consistently praised across five decades. A dance instructor at NYU, present at the very first performance of the partial version of Fase in Purchase in 1981, described an "astonished audience" witnessing what he regarded as the revelation of "a new kind of choreographer emerging from nowhere." Between 1982 and 1985, the piece was acclaimed by various European institutions that scheduled over one hundred performances during this period, which were particularly well received by critics (Note: "The tour exposure brought many positive responses to the work of this intensively serious and ambitious young choreographer" (Bremser & De Keersmaeker 1999)) and brought De Keersmaeker immediate fame. Furthermore, its reprisal in New York in 1999 earned a Bessie Award nearly 20 years after its initial creation at the same venue. Highlighting the work's significance as a milestone in choreography and its influence on De Keersmaeker's unique choreographic grammar, Philippe Guisgand asserts that its impact goes beyond the choreographer's immediate universe.

[Fase] creates its own space, which would go on to reorganize the entire Belgian choreographic landscape.

In 2011, Fase's place in contemporary dance history was further emphasized by the programming of the Violin Phase movement at the Museum of Modern Art in New York — and the following year by performances at the Tate Modern in London. On this occasion, some critics questioned the potential entry of dance into modern and contemporary art museums, particularly about this work. Moreover, Fase was recognized at the 2011 Avignon Festival as one of the highlights of the edition, which that year was notably marked by contemporary dance under the artistic direction of Boris Charmatz, the designated associate artist.

The extremely repetitive nature of the various choreographic movements can lead some spectators to find these pieces "exasperating" due to their reliance on subtle shifts, repetitions, and variations, whose demands for patience and "heightened attention" may also provoke "boredom." For Guisgand, this work requires an "acceptance of a dilation of time through successive revelations," and if a viewer "sees only sameness, there’s no point in staying; they must let go to appreciate the subtle effects that emerge progressively and become increasingly evident."

== Technical Information ==
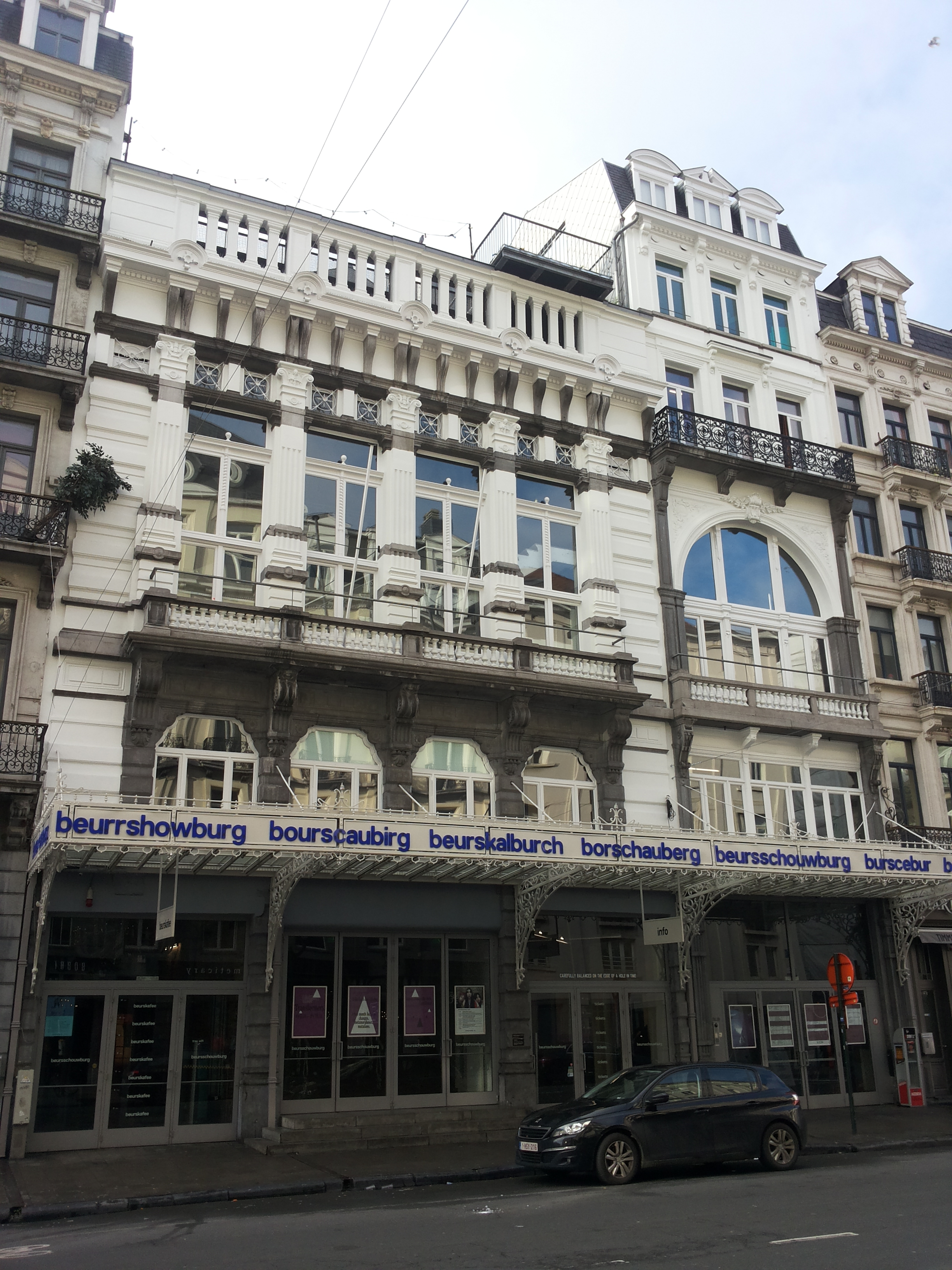
The Bourse Theater, where the first complete performance of Fase took place in 1982.

- Choreography: Anne Teresa De Keersmaeker
- Dancers: Anne Teresa De Keersmaeker and Michèle Anne De Mey at the creation. Anne Teresa De Keersmaeker and Tale Dolven from the late 1990s to 2015; Cynthia Loemij and Tale Dolven alternatively. Yuika Hashimoto and Laura Maria Poletti alternating with Laura Bachman and Soa Ratsifandrihana since 2018
- Music: Steve Reich — Piano Phase, Violin Phase, Come Out, and Clapping Music, performed live by Edmund Niemann and Nurit Tilles on piano, and Shem Guibbory on violin
- Lighting: Remon Fromont and Mark Schwentner
- Costumes: Martine André and Anne Teresa De Keersmaeker
- Production: Schaamte (Design), Rosas company, and De Munt/La Monnaie
- First partial creation: April 1981 during the "Festival of the Early Years" in Purchase, United States
- First full version: March 18, 1982, at the Bourse Theater in Brussels, Belgium
- First revival: November 12, 1992, at Varia Theater in Brussels
- Performances: More than 200 from 1982 to 2020
- Duration: Approximately 50 minutes
- Award: Bessie Award on September 24, 1999, in New York

== Bibliography ==
- Adolphe, Jean-Marc (2002). Rosas - Anne Teresa De Keersmaeker [Roses - Anne Teresa De Keersmaeker] (in French). Tournai: La Renaissance du livre. ISBN 2-8046-0695-3.
- Guisgand, Philippe (2008). Les Fils d'un entrelacs sans fin : La danse dans l'œuvre d'Anne Teresa de Keersmaeker [The Sons of an Endless Interlacing: Dance in the Work of Anne Teresa de Keersmaeker] (in French). Presses universitaires du Septentrion. ISBN 978-2-7574-0029-6.
- Keersmaeker, Anne Teresa; Cvejić, Bojana (2012). Carnets d'une chorégraphe : Fase, Rosas danst Rosas, Elena's Aria, Bartók [Notebooks of a choreographer: Fase, Rosas danst Rosas, Elena's Aria, Bartók] (in French). Fonds Mercator et Rosas. ISBN 978-90-6153-538-6.
