= Patricia Martín =

Patricia Martín Méndez (Mexico City) is a curator and art writer. She has conceptualized and directed three of the most relevant contemporary art foundations in Latin America: Colección Jumex, Fundación Alumnos 47 y Fundación Casa Wabi. In addition to creating the infrastructure to operate these institutions, she also served as chief curator, director of acquisitions; and she developed and promoted their educational, sponsorship and scholarship programs.

She was in charge of the Colección AXA México (2009-2015), as well as the Residencias Cruzadas program at Casa de Francia, México (2011-2014). She has also independently curated multiple exhibitions.

As a teacher she has taught conferences, courses and seminars in Mexico, Costa Rica, Colombia, Argentina, Spain and the United States. She has published essays, reviews, articles, and edited several art catalogs. From 2013 to 2018, she published a weekly column focused on contemporary art and its connection with the local and global sociopolitical reality in the Mexican newspaper El Financiero.

== Current projects ==
In 2017, she created Andamiaje, a digital platform that rethinks the way the art market operates, encouraging unprecedented interaction between collectors, consolidated and emerging artists, in order to support the work of the latter.

== Casa Wabi Foundation ==
In 2014, Martín conceived the program under which Fundación Casa Wabi operates. An interdisciplinary project whose objective was to create an exchange of ideas between national and international artists of various disciplines and the communities surrounding the project, located in the Costa Chica of Oaxaca in the southern Mexican Pacific. During her tenure a residency program, a sculpture garden and a robust community cultural exchange were created. During the first year of operation and in absolute record time Martín achieved:

- 53 national and international artists residencies, among them: Antonio Bravo, Lawrance Carroll, Marilá Dardot, Carla Fernández, Simon Fujiwara, Gabriela Galván, Koo Jeong A, Gonzalo Lebrija, Kelly Loudenberg, Diego Quemada-Diez, Calixto Ramírez, Santiago Sierra, Noemí Vulpian, Richard Wentworth, Héctor Zamora.
- 52 workshops.
- 134 sessions with the communities, with the participation of more than 869 locals.

From their management, the communities acquired the confidence to interact with the foundation in a proactive and natural way, driven by programs according to their needs.

Martín supervised the exhibition Two Rhythms For A Frieze by Daniel Buren (2014) and cured the exhibition of Tierra Vaga by Michel François and Harold Ancart (2016).

She directed Fundación Casa Wabi until the beginning of 2016.

== Fundación Alumnos 47 ==
Between 2006 and 2010, Martín collaborated with Moisés Cosío establishing the bases to create Fundación Alumnos 47: a non-profit organization with a mission to stimulate the creation, consideration and promotion of national and international contemporary art, through an autonomous body which worked as a laboratory for artistic analysis, research, training and production.

== Yvon Lambert Gallery ==
In 2005, upon leaving Colección Jumex, Martín moved to New York to direct the program at Yvon Lambert Gallery. She remained there until 2007 and develop the internal restructuring project of the organization. Thus positioning the gallery within the American art panorama, while supporting and promoting the work of its represented artists. Under her direction, the gallery showed individual exhibitions by artists such as Joan Jonas, Mircea Cantor, Charles Sandison, and Sislej Xhafa.

== La Colección Jumex ==
In 1997 Martín began to imagine what was three years later known as La Colección Jumex: one of the most influential and visionary contemporary art programs in Latin America. From 1997 to 2005 she served as director and chief curator. Under her supervision an exhibition hall, artwork protection warehouses and a public library of contemporary art were built inside the most important juice factory in Mexico, where seminars, workshops and several educational programs were held. Martín's work inside the foundation was crucial for the dissemination of Mexican contemporary art on the global scene, as well as for the insertion of international art on the Mexican scene.

In the words of Eugenio López Alonso, president of the foundation, Martín's work at Colección Jumex was key to the construction of Fundación Jumex: "When we started the foundation, I met Patricia, who was the first curator of the collection, and together we planned a different project, an adventure that has not stopped growing since then."

Within Colección Jumex she promoted multilevel and multimodal dialogues around contemporary art, through collaboration agreements with artists, curators, researchers and public institutions. In the eight years Martin was in charge of the evolution and growth of the art collection, she acquired more than 1,200 works. Since the late 1990s, she included important work by contemporary artists such as Tacita Dean, Thomas Demand, Rineke Dijkstra, Olafur Eliasson, Fischli & Weiss, Ceal Floyer, Dan Graham, Jenny Holzer, Bas Jan Ader, Donald Judd, Sarah Lucas, On Kawara, Rivane Neuenschwander and Robert Smithson, among many others. Martín's greatest contribution was her vision to gather and show––together with the aforementioned consolidated artists––the work of emerging Mexican contemporary artists such as Francis Alÿs, Daniel Guzmán, Teresa Margolles, Gabriel Orozco, Damián Ortega, Fernando Ortega, Ale de la Puente, Santiago Sierra, Melanie Smith and Pablo Vargas Lugo, among many others (who are today renowned and have global successful artistic trajectories). In this way, Martín created a process where Mexican artistic production gradually began to be intertwined with the international art scene.

== Family and early career ==
Martín is the daughter of a Spanish Civil War refugee in Mexico and a Yucatecan woman who from an early age became the breadwinner of her family.

She began her professional career as an art director for film productions; She worked on more than 40 projects related to advertising, music videos and movies, in Mexico and abroad. To continue her work from new and different sources, she moved to the United Kingdom in 1994.

According to Juan Villoro: "We are facing a drop-out of unwavering determination that at age 19 decided to put into practice the Beatles song 'She's Leaving Home'".

She enrolled in the Post-war and Contemporary Art master's program at the University of Manchester, earned her degree in 1997. Between 1995 and 1997 she also directed the research for Lisson Gallery 30th Anniversary in London.

Villoro continues: "When Patricia boarded the plane back in 1997 she asked herself in the clouds: 'What the hell am I going to do in Mexico?' In absolute confusion she had an epiphany: 'I will make a private collection of contemporary art.' I only knew that: I wanted to gather art without official support."

Patricia Martín is married with two children.

== Exhibitions ==
Shows curated by Martín at La Colección Jumex:

- Rodney Graham, Ecatepec, Edo. de México, México, 2005.
- Los usos de la imagen, fotografía filme y video en La Colección Jumex (co-curada con Carlos Basualdo), MALBA, Buenos Aires, Argentina. 2004.
- Eden, Antiguo Colegio de San Ildefonso, Ciudad de México, México, 2003. Biblioteca Luis Ángel Arango, Bogotá, Colombia, 2004.
- Thisplay, Ecatepec, Edo. de México, México, 2002.
- Exposición Inaugural de la Colección Jumex, Ecatepec, Edo. de México, México, 2001.
- 33 piezas, Museo de Arte Carrillo Gil, Ciudad de México, México, 1999.

During her tenure at Colección Jumex, Martín created and managed a curatorial program where she welcomed national and international curators to do critical readings on the collection, such as:

- On Kawara, Conciencia, Meditación, Observador en las colinas, Jonathan Watkins, 2005.
- La Colmena, Guillermo Santamarina, 2004.
- Killing Time and Listening Between the Lines, Philippe Vergne & Douglas Fogle, 2003.
- The Theory of Leisure, Dan Cameron, 2002.

== Independent exhibitions ==
In addition to her extensive work with organizations and institutions, Martín is a prolific independent curator. She has been organizing exhibitions since 1999, including:

- Tierra Vaga, Michel François & Harold Ancart, Oaxaca, 2016.
- Naturaleza Humana: Ugo Rondinone, Museo Anahuacalli, Ciudad de México, México, 2014.
- Fischli & Weiss, Museo Tamayo, Ciudad de México, México, 2004.
- Strawberry Fields, Julie Becker, Mónica Espinosa, Freiderich Kunath, Henri Michaux, OPA, Guadalajara y CANAIA, Ciudad de México, 2004.
- Sunday Afternoon, 303 Gallery, Nueva York., Estados Unidos, 2002.
- Proyecto 4X: Francis Alÿs, Jonathan Hernández, Pedro Reyes & Laureana Toledo, Museo de las Artes de Guadalajara, Guadalajara, México, 2001.
- Aprendiendo menos, Gabriel Orozco, Fischli & Weiss, y Richard Wentworth, Centro de la Imagen, Ciudad de México, México. Biblioteca Luis Ángel Arango, Bogotá, Colombia, 2001.
- 6 Young British Artists in LA International, Chac Mool Gallery, Los Ángeles, Estados Unidos, 1999.
