= Pierre Droulers =

Pierre Droulers (born 5 July 1951 in La Madeleine, France) is a French and Belgian choreographer and dancer.

He spent three years in artistic training at Maurice Béjart's Mudra School in Brussels and then studied with Jerzy Grotowski in Poland. Later, he participated in Bob Wilson's workshops in Paris. In 1978, during a trip in New York City, he discovered Steve Paxton's work which was a source of inspiration.

Since September 2005, he has been co-directing Charleroi/Danses, the Choreographic Centre of the French Community, with Michèle Anne De Mey, Thierry De Mey and Vincent Thirion.

== Creations ==
- 1976–1978: Dispersion
- 1976–1978: Désert
- 1978–1979: Hedges (solo with saxophonist Steve Lacy)
- 1978–1979: Everlone
- 1980–1981: Tao (with Sherryl Sutton)
- 1981–1982: Tips (with the future Grand Magasin)
- 1982–1983: Pieces for Nothing (original music by Minimal Compact)
- 1983–1984: La Jetée
- 1984–1985: Miserere (with Winston Tong and Sussan Deyhim)
- 1985–1986: Midi Minuit
- 1985–1986: Improvisation (movie)
- 1986–1987: Face à face (with Michèle Anne De Mey)
- 1987–1988: Cadavres Exquis
- 1991: Remains (with saxophonist Steve Lacy)
- 1991: Comme si on était leurs Petits Poucets
- 1992: Humeurs
- 1993: Jamais de l'Abîme
- 1995: Mountain/Fountain (with Belgian artist Michel François)
- 1996: Les Beaux Jours
- 1996: De l'Air et du Vent
- 1997: Petites Formes
- 1998: Multum in Parvo
- 1999: Aventures, Nouvelles Aventures by György Ligeti (with Jim Clayburgh)
- 1999: Sortie
- 2001: MA (with Michel François, Ann Veronica Janssens and Yuji Oshima)
- 2002: Sames (duo with Stefan Dreher)
- 2004: Inouï (with Ann Veronica Janssens)
- 2007: Flowers
- 2009: Walk Talk Chalk
