= José Besprosvany =

Mexican choreographer, theater director, producer

- Born: October 13, 1959 (age 67); Mexico City, Mexico
- Citizenship: Mexico
- Occupations: dancer, choreographer, director, producer
- Years active: 1983 to present
- Dancing career
- Current group: Compagnie José Besprosvany
- Website: www.besprosvany.be

José Besprosvany (October 13, 1959) is a Mexican-born dancer, choreographer, director, producer and teacher, who has developed his career in Europe. Born in 1959 in Mexico, he is a second-generation Mexican with Russian Jewish origins. He has been living and working in Brussels since 1980.

He has been noted as one of Belgium’s contemporary dance innovators and reformers.

== Life ==
Born in 1959 in Mexico, he is a second-generation Mexican whose Russian Jewish grandparents immigrated to José's native country in the 1920s. In 1978, he left Mexico to study in France, seeking better opportunities to nurture his development in the arts field. He later moved to Belgium, where he has been living for more than 40 years. Since the early 1980s, he has been one of the reformers of Francophone Belgian contemporary dance, along with the Mossoux-Bonté Company, Pierre Droulers, Michèle Noiret, and Michèle-Anne de Mey.

José Besprosvany attended the École Jacques Lecoq in Paris, where he studied theater (mime, movement, acting, and mask play). During his studies as a dancer at the Mudra school founded by Maurice Béjart, he met the musician and teacher Fernand Schirren, who taught him that breathing and heartbeat are at the core of each word and gesture, and how bringing these two together results in rhythm. He then danced with Maurice Béjart's 20th Century Ballet for two years.

== Career ==
In 1986, José Besprosvany founded his own company, which provides a vehicle for his constant quest to find different modes of expression, and has since resulted in a forceful and varied repertoire. His initial creations, minimalist in style, were followed by a series of productions that questioned the relationship between modern and classical languages. After this, José explored the relationships between narrative and dance.

In the late 1990s, José Besprosvany re-examined his work, which he judged to be too conformist and too close to official contemporary art forms, and began to approach performing arts from a different angle, which he continues to develop to this day, revealing a marked interest in non-Western performances, with a focus on the relationship between North and South. In recent years, his work has frequently incorporated puppetry. Besprosvany's work also shows an interest in updated versions of Ancient Greek texts, illustrating that their themes remain relevant today. He has produced several versions of the story of Prometheus, and his Oedipe and Antigone include references to current social issues.

In parallel to his passion for dance, José Besprosvany is interested in directing for both theater and cinema.

He counts among his numerous awards and distinctions: Il Coreografo Electronico (Italy) and the Bert Leysen Prijs (Belgium), as well as the Special Jury Award in Danscreen (Germany) for the dance video Andrès (1993), the Award for the Best Show of the Year in the French-speaking community of Belgium for La Princesse de Babylone (2004), and the Spectators’ Award and Prize for New Art Forms at the Rainbow Festival (Russia) for A propos de Butterfly (2007).

== Scenic works ==
- 1984: Momentum (with Emmanuelle Huynh), Brussels
- 1986: Evento, Anvers
- 1988: Tempéraments (with Emmanuelle Huynh), Louvain
- 1989: Von heute auf morgen, Amsterdam
- 1990: Apollon, la nuit, Atelier Sainte-Anne — Cabo de Buena Esperanza, for the Ballet royal de Wallonie
- 1992: Dido and Æneas, for La Monnaie — Medeamaterial, for La Monnaie — Retours, Atelier Sainte-Anne
- 1993: Cuarteto, Atelier Sainte-Anne — Ixtazihuatl, Charleroi
- 1994: Prométhée, Atelier Sainte-Anne
- 1995: Hombre alado, Namur
- 1996: Lara
- 1996: Elles
- 1996: Les Indifférents
- 1997: L'invisible
- 1999: Dos y dos
- 1999: Belle à mourir
- 2002: Triptico
- 2003: La Princesse de Babylone
- 2004: À propos de Butterfly
- 2006: 9
- 2007: La Belle au bois de Dandaka
- 2009: Inventions
- 2010: Prométhée enchaîné
- 2011: Dobles
- 2013: Oedipe
- 2015: Espejo
- 2017: Antigone
- 2019: Petrushka / The Firebird

== Cinematography ==
Besprosvany directed the following cinematographic works that have been shown in international festivals:

- 1992: Andrès
- 2004: Le Dessin
