= Violin Phase =

1967 composition by Steve Reich

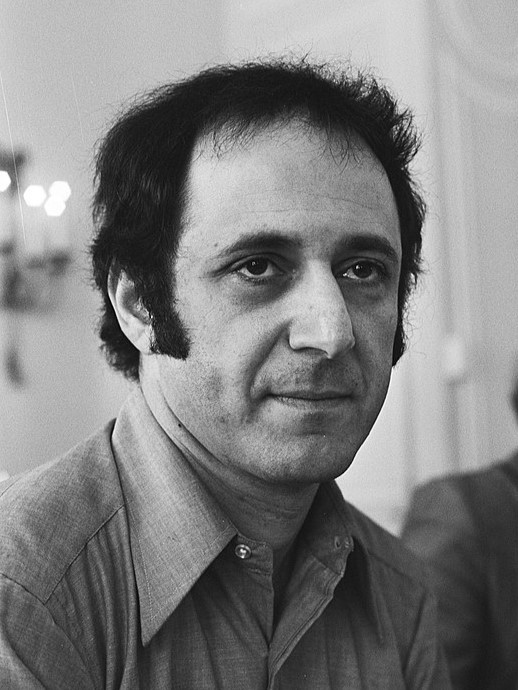
Steve Reich in 1976

Violin Phase is a musical work written by minimalist composer Steve Reich in October 1967.

== Structure ==
Violin Phase is an example of Reich's phasing technique, previously used in It's Gonna Rain, Come Out, Reed Phase, and Piano Phase, in which the music itself is created not by the instruments but by interactions of temporal variations on an original melody. Music of this kind is generally referred to as process music. It is the third in a series of instrumental compositions (together with Reed Phase and Piano Phase) in which Reich explored the possibility of phasing in music for a live player with tape accompaniment or, in the case of Piano Phase, for just two players (Potter 2000, 180).

In Violin Phase, two violins are recorded and played back, together at first. They are then made to go slowly out of sync by adding silence to one of the tapes. A new melody is formed by the interaction of the two out of sync instruments and is then accented by a third violin. This process is repeated with variations throughout the rest of the piece.

The most conspicuous difference between a "live" process piece like Violin Phase and Reich's tape pieces is that the latter consist of "pure phasing", with a slow and regular rate of change, whereas the live pieces are "stepped", alternating sections of gradual dephasing with sections of temporary rhythmic stability (Warburton 1988, 144).

Dominic Frasca arranged the piece for electric guitar and tape (or four electric guitars), recorded in 2001 as 'Electric Guitar Phase' and released on the album Steve Reich: Triple Quartet.

== Discography ==
- Steve Reich: Live/Electric Music. Violin Phase (Paul Zukofsky, violin), and It's Gonna Rain. LP recording 1 sound disc: analog, 33⅓ rpm, stereo; 12 in. Columbia MS 7265. New York: Columbia Records, 1969.
- Steve Reich. Music for a Large Ensemble; Violin Phase; Octet. Steve Reich and Musicians. The 1st and 3rd works recorded at Columbia Recording Studios, New York, Feb. 1980; the 2nd at Tonstudio Bauer, Ludwigsburg, Mar. 1980. Shem Guibbory, violin (in the 2nd work). Violin Phase recorded Mar. 1980 at Tonstudio Bauer, Ludwigsburg. Music for a Large Ensemble and Octet recorded February 1980 at Columbia Recording Studios, New York. LP recording 1 sound disc: analog, 33⅓ rpm; 12 in. ECM-1-1168. Burbank, Calif: ECM Records, 1980. Reissued on CD 1987, ECM Records 827 287-2; ECM 1168.
- Steve Reich and Chris Hughes. "Shift from the Music of Steve Reich". (Part III is a segment from "Violin Phase"). Chris Hughes, keyboards and drums; Stuart Gordon, violin; Paul Ridout, kalimba, bells; Maire Brennan, harp. Recorded at The Woolhall, Somerset, England. Compact disc 1 sound disc: digital, stereo, 4¾ in. Point Music 314 518 843-2. London: Point Music, 1994. Reissued, Helium Records HeCD002; Helium Records B001562402; Helium Records DCAB001562402. New York: Helium Records, 2006.
- City Life. (New York Counterpoint; Eight Lines; Octet; Violin Phase.) Roland Diry, clarinet (2nd work); Jagdish Mistry, violin (4th work); Ensemble Modern (1st and 3rd works); Peter Rundel (1st work), Bradley Lubman (3rd work), conductors. Recorded at the Sendesaal des Hessischen Rundfunks, Frankfurt, Germany, January 14–15, 1998 (1st work), April 2002 (2nd work), June 28–29, 1997 (3rd work), and May 2002 (4th work). Compact disc 1 sound disc: digital, stereo, 4¾ in. RCA Red Seal 74321 66459 2. [N.p.]: BMG Classics, 2002.
- Steve Reich and Musicians, Live 1977. From the Kitchen Archives no. 2. (Drumming, part four; Six Pianos; Violin Phase; Music for Pieces of Wood; Pendulum Music) Steve Reich and Musicians, recorded live at the Kitchen, New York, May 16–19, 1977. Compact disc, 1 sound disc: digital, stereo, 4¾ in. Orange Mountain Music omm0018. New York: Orange Mountain Music, 2005.
- Warp Works & Twentieth Century Masters. (With works by Aphex Twin, John Cage, György Ligeti, Conlon Nancarrow, Squarepusher, Karlheinz Stockhausen, Edgard Varèse.) Clio Gould, violin; other artists. Compact disc, 2 sound discs: digital, stereo, 4¾ in. Warp WARPCD144. [N.p.]: Warp, 2006.

== Violin Phase in Arts ==
In dance, the piece has been used in 1982 by the Belgian choreographer Anne Teresa De Keersmaeker as the central part of one of her seminal works, Fase, which became a cornerstone of contemporary dance.
