= Fumiyo =

- Gender: Unisex

Origin
- Origin: Japanese
- Meaning: Different meanings depending on the kanji used

Fumiyo (written: 史代 or 文世) is a unisex Japanese given name. Notable people with the name include:

- Fumiyo Kōno (こうの 史代; born 1968), Japanese manga artist
- Fumiyo Kohinata (小日向 文世; born 1954), Japanese actor
- Fumiyo Ikeda (born 1962), Japanese dancer, actress and choreographer
- Fumiyo Yoshida (吉田 文代; born 1981), Japanese triple jumper
- Fumiyo Yamashita-Kaizu (born 1967), Japanese table tennis player
