= Clapping Music =

1972 composition by Steve Reich

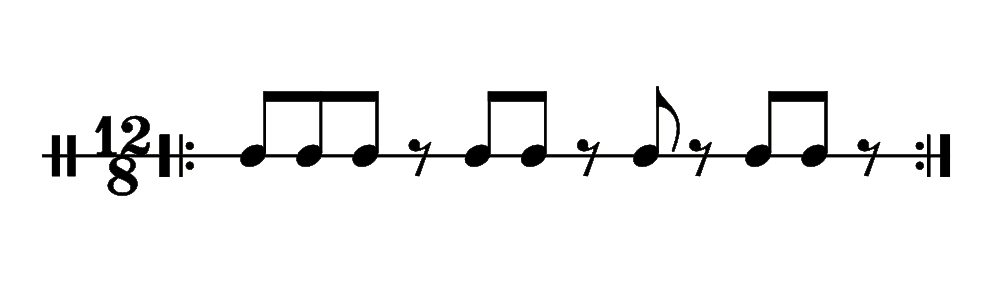
Clapping Music rhythm First two patterns, abbreviated; also common in other works by Reich

Visualization as two discs sharing an identical pattern on a common spool. This pattern may be contrasted with itself at all positions by spinning one of the discs.

Clapping Music is a minimalist piece written by American composer Steve Reich in 1972. It is written for two performers and is performed entirely by clapping.

After a concert in Brussels during their 1972 tour of Europe, Reich and his ensemble went to a club to see a performance by two flamenco musicians on the promoter's advice. By Reich's account, the flamenco musicians were "terrible" guitarists and singers, but when they started clapping very loudly, Reich and his group, who were mainly percussionists, joined in. After the concert, Reich realized that he could use clapping as the basis for a composition which "needed no instruments beyond the human body".

Clapping Music uses a variation of the phasing technique that Reich had used in earlier compositions such as Piano Phase. One performer claps a basic rhythm, a variation on an African bell pattern in 12/8 time, for the entirety of the piece. The other claps the same pattern, but after every eight or twelve bars shifts ahead by one eighth note, skipping one note or rest in the pattern. The two performers continue this process until the second performer has shifted by twelve eighth notes and is hence playing the pattern in unison with the first performer again. A typical recording of the piece, as included in Reich's Works 1965–1995 box set, lasts just under five minutes.

The piece was first performed at the Contemporary Arts Museum in Houston on November 13, 1973.

In 1982, the Belgian choreographer Anne Teresa De Keersmaeker scored part of her work Fase to the piece, alongside three other works by Reich.

In 2012, an authorized arrangement for solo piano of Clapping Music was released on the album Which Way Is Up? by Simon Rackham.

Imagine Dragons used Clapping Music as the foundation for their 2012 song "On Top of the World", although only a short sample is used. The piece is also utilized on a remix by James Murphy of the 2013 David Bowie song "Love Is Lost".

"Steve Reich's Clapping Music" iOS app was released in 2015.
