= Charleroi Danses =

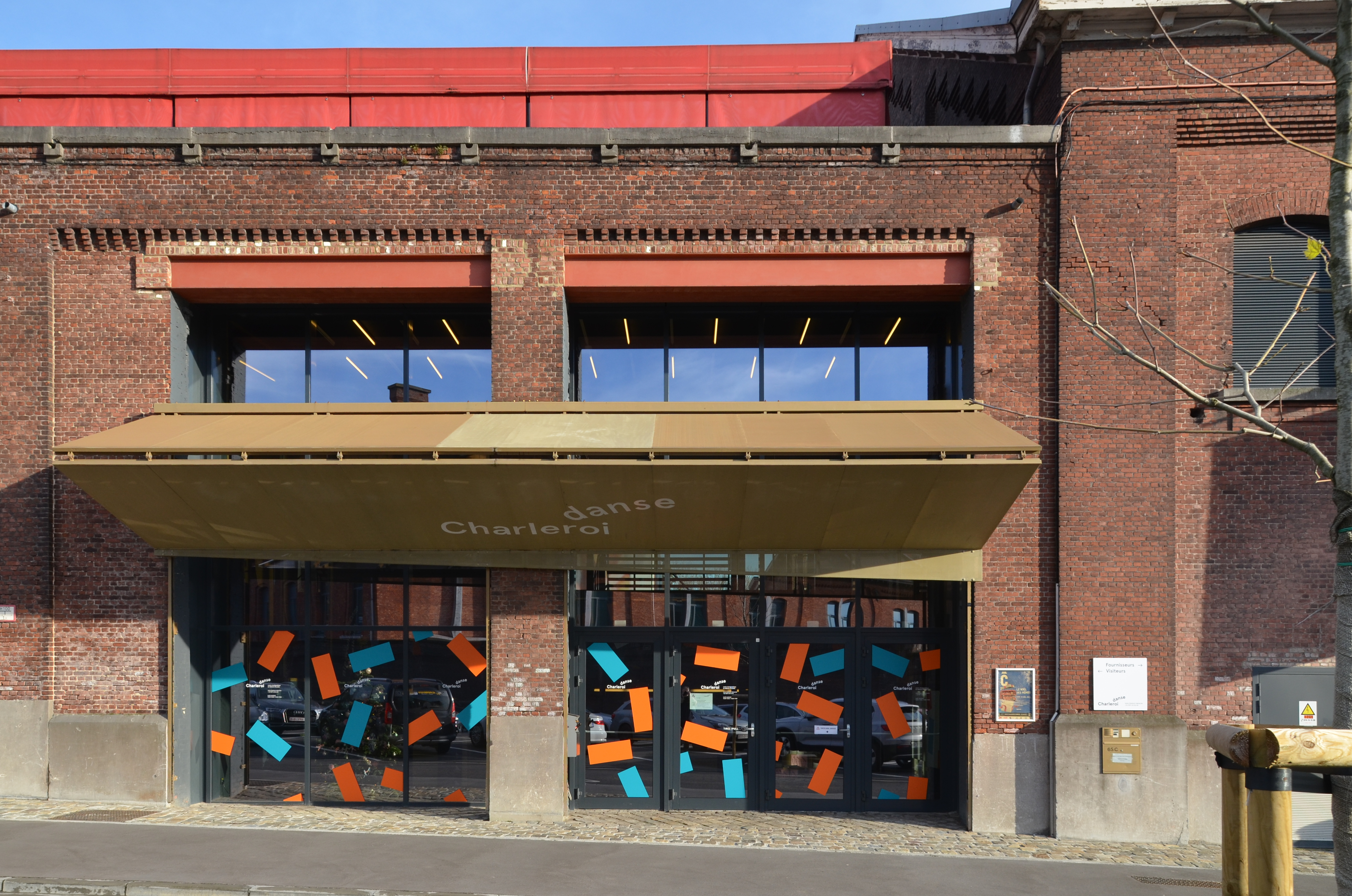
- Écuries (Stables) entrance on boulevard Mayence in Charleroi

General information
- Name: Charleroi Danses
- Previous names: Royal Ballet of Wallonia
- Year founded: 1966
- Website: www.charleroi-danses.be

Senior staff
- Coordinator: Vincent Thirion

Charleroi Danses (Le Centre Chorégraphique de la Communauté Française Wallonie-Bruxelles) is the choreography center of the French Community of Belgium.

== History ==
The company originated with the Royal Ballet of Wallonia, (Ballet Royale de Wallonie), founded in 1966, which was brought under the direction of Frédéric Flamand in 1991. He renamed the company Charleroi/Danse and shifted the focus of the troupe entirely onto modern dance. Frédéric Flamand directed the company between 1991 and 2004 and made the institution well known not only in Belgium but also internationally. In September 2004 he was appointed artistic director of Ballet National de Marseille.

After a call for candidates for his succession, the board proposed to the Minister of Culture Fadila Laanan a four-headed structure. The new coordinator of Charleroi Danses is Vincent Thirion, assisted by Michèle Anne De Mey, Pierre Droulers and Thierry De Mey. They came into office on 1 July 2005. Charleroi Danses has premises in Charleroi called "The Stables" focused on contemporary art, and a branch in Brussels.

== Premises ==
In 2012 a group of brick buildings was opened as an extension to the Charleroi/Danses premises, holding dance studios and residences for artists. The elements of the new complex are connected by a large plaza that can be accessed directly from the street and that contains a public brasserie. This is part of a project that also included a 75-metre (246 ft) passive-energy elliptical tower holding police offices. The project won the MIPIM Awards announced in Cannes in 2012 for the "Best Futura Project".
