= Michel François (artist) =

Belgian artist

- Born: 1956 (age 69–70); Saint Trond, Belgium
- Known for: Sculpture, Installation

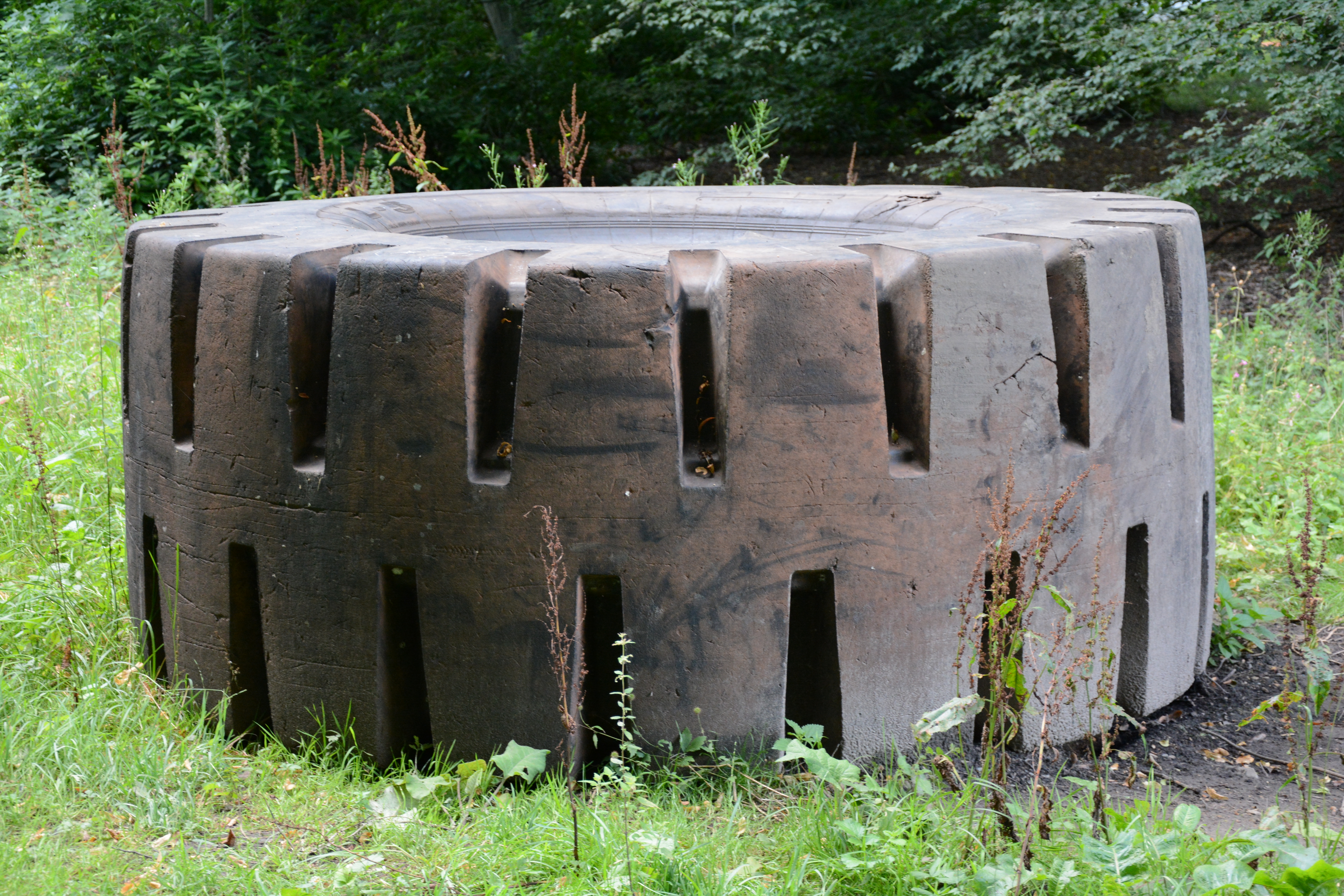
Pièce à Conviction, 2012

Michel François (French pronunciation: [miʃɛl fʁɑ̃swa]; born 1956 in Saint-Trond) is a Belgian conceptual artist.

== Biography ==
Born in a family of artists, Michel François studied theatre then graduated from the École de Recherche Graphique in Brussels.

Since the start of his career as an artist in the early 1980s, he exhibited his work throughout Europe, the United States, Mexico, Brazil, and Japan.

Michel François took part in two key events in contemporary art, Documenta 9 in Kassel in 1992 and the 48th Venice Biennale, in 1999, where he represented Belgium alongside Ann Veronica Janssens with the installation Horror vacui. This granted him international recognition.

In the 1990s, Michel François was represented in Paris by Jennifer Flay's gallery. Since 2011, he works with the Galerie Kamel Mennour.

The first monographic and retrospective exhibition of the artist, at a key moment in his career, took place ten years later, in 2009, with Plans d'évasion, organized by SMAK Ghent and the Institut d'art contemporain de Villeurbanne.

In 2012, Michel François produced a personal exhibition at the CRAC Occitanie, Pièces à conviction, at the same time as he presented his works on paper at the École des Beaux-Arts in Paris.

In 2023, Brussels' BOZAR organised a 40-year retrospective on his work, entitled Contre Nature.

Michel François has exhibited his work widely across Europe. Since 2009, he has taught at the École Nationale Supérieure des Beaux-Arts in Paris and also collaborates regularly with choreographers (Pierre Droulers, Anne Teresa De Keersmaeker).

He lives and works in Brussels, Belgium. In 1985 he met Ann Veronica Janssens, with whom he lived and worked for some 30 years, before separating. Their daughter, Léone François, is a Belgian actress.

== Work ==
His art explores a variety of media including installation, video, sculpture and photography. The materials of his work can be either man-made (glass, bricks, gypsum, aluminium foil, polystyrene, newspapers) or natural (leaves, cactus, water, dandelions). The objects that he manipulates assume figurative and dynamic functions. "I said to myself that sculpture was a middle ground between dance and painting," he explained.

Through all these objects, Michel François establishes a network of correspondences, echoes and analogies which creates an overall coherence rather than defining a style: "a subliminal network of reasons and values which can be apprehended only in the confrontation of works in space".

Xavier Hufkens has likened his work to the Arte Povera school, for the way Michel François turns simple and everyday objects into carriers of meaning, which varies according to context and juxtaposition. Looking at simple objects and mundane gestures, Michel François explores order and disorder, resistance and fragility.

The titles of his exhibition point to his interest for contemporary reality, offices, domestic environments, surveillance, psychology and the police state, e.g. State of Being, Urban Placarding, Expanded Bureau, Déjà vu, Theatre of Operations and Pieces of Evidence. The prison universe returns in his works, from the explicit design of a cell drown on the ground (TBS, Plan de Cellule, 2009) to the cube of glass with violently broken walls (Piece à Conviction, Broken Pavilion, 2009), and to the references to the panopticon in his last works.

His works intends to generate a reflection on cause and effect and the passage of time. Some of his most recent works also tend to hide the artist behind seemingly natural processes of transformation of the matter (as in the slow erosion of saltrock by water drops), which is also the creation of the artwork: "We must recognize that it is a project, that of a museum invaded by living things that are developing".

== Bibliography ==
- Theys, Hans, "Michel François: Carnet d’expositions 1999-2002,” published by Ursula-Blickle-Stiftung
- Kraichtal, Westfälischer Kunstverein Münster, Galleria d’Arte Moderna Bologna, 2002.
- François, Michel, “La Plante en Nous/Die Pflanze in Uns,” published by Haus der Kunst, Munich, 2000.
- François, Michel, “En Même temps,” published by Bibliothèque Royale de Belgique, 1998.
- François, Michel, “Michel François,” published by la Societe des Expositions du Palais des Beaux-Arts de Bruxelles, 1993.
- François, Michel, “Où Je Suis, Vu Du Ciel,” published by Espace 251 Nord a.s.b.l. (Liege)/Ante Post a.s.b.l (Bruxelles), 1999.
