= Yvon Lambert Gallery =

Art gallery in Paris, France

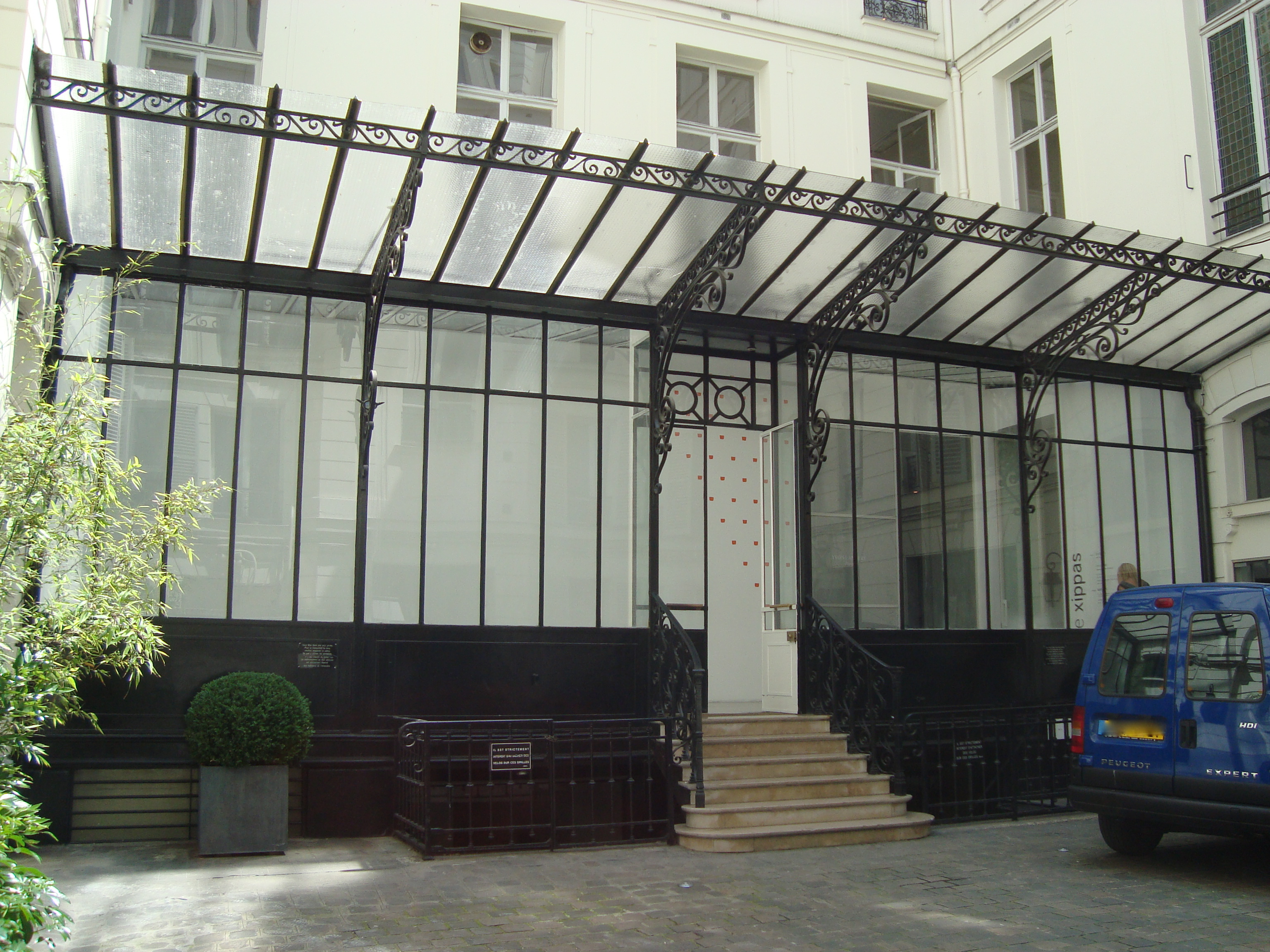
Entrance of the Yvon Lambert Gallery, rue Vieille-du-Temple in Paris.48°51′35″N 2°21′37″E

Yvon Lambert Gallery is a contemporary art gallery in Paris founded by Yvon Lambert in 1966.

== History ==
In 1966, Yvon Lambert opened his first gallery on the rue de L'Échaudé in Paris, France where he began to exhibit American artists. He showed founders of conceptualism, minimalism and land art such as Carl Andre and Lawrence Weiner.

Lambert left the 6th arrondissement in 1977 for rue du Grenier St Lazare in the Marais, where he exhibited artists including Miquel Barceló, Joseph Beuys, Louise Lawler, Jean-Charles Blais, and Allan McCollum. In 1986 he moved again to the glass-roofed space on rue Vieille du Temple where Lambert affirmed strong relationships with artists such as Joan Jonas, Nan Goldin, Jenny Holzer, Thierry Kuntzel, Glenn Ligon and Anselm Kiefer. Yvon Lambert Paris closed its location at 108 rue Vieille du Temple in December 2014.

In 2003, Lambert established his international representation by founding a new gallery in Chelsea, New York City. From 2003-2004 the Program Director of the gallery was the independent art curator and historian Patricia Martín. In 2005, the New York City gallery moved to West 21st street in a 700 square metres (7,500 square feet) space designed by Richard Gluckman in collaboration with Thomas Zolli and Rachel D. Vancelette. At the end of 2014, Lambert closed the gallery on rue Vieille-du-Temple in Paris and instead opened a storefront book shop for publishing his limited-edition artist's books on rue des Filles du Calvaire. David Zwirner opened his first European gallery in the former Lambert space on rue Vieille-du-Temple in 2019.

Yvon Lambert announced on his 75th birthday, not long after the attack on Andres Serrano's "Piss Christ" at Fondation Yvon Lambert in Avignon, that he would close his New York location. A large group show opened on the 21 May 2011 with many of the gallery's New York artists, marked the closing.

Lambert is vice-chairman of the Fondation Vincent van Gogh Arles.

== Collection Lambert - Avignon ==
In 2000, Yvon Lambert opened the Collection Lambert en Avignon in the former space of the Hôtel de Caumont in Avignon, France. It has since expanded to the neighbouring Hôtel de Montfaucon, doubling the exhibition space from 1,800 square feet (170 square metres) to 3,500 square feet (330 square metres).

The collection opened with 350 works from Yvon Lambert's private collection and presents more than 1,200 works by contemporary artists. Today, it includes more than 30 works by Cy Twombly and 35 sculptures, works on paper and wall drawings by Sol LeWitt. Other artists represented include Donald Judd, Jean-Michel Basquiat, Anselm Kiefer and Nan Goldin. In 2015, Francesco Vezzoli donated the needlework piece Les Parapluies d'Avignon (2015).

In 2010, Lambert threatened to withdraw his collection after publicly criticizing the city of Avignon for allowing the Hôtel de Caumont to fall into disrepair. Converting the Hôtel de Montfaucon was a condition imposed by Lambert when he promised 560 works to the French State one year later; at the time, the donation was described as France's largest gift of art since the Pablo Picasso estate's donation in 1974. Following the building's renovation in 2015, the Hôtel de Caumont hosts the temporary exhibitions while the adjoining Hôtel de Montfaucon is home to the permanent collection. Both historic mansions belong to the city of Avignon; the €14 million cost of the conversion was met by the French government (€8 million) and local authorities. The collection is run by the city on a budget of some €440,000 per year.
