= Frédéric Flamand =

Belgian actor, director, and choreographer

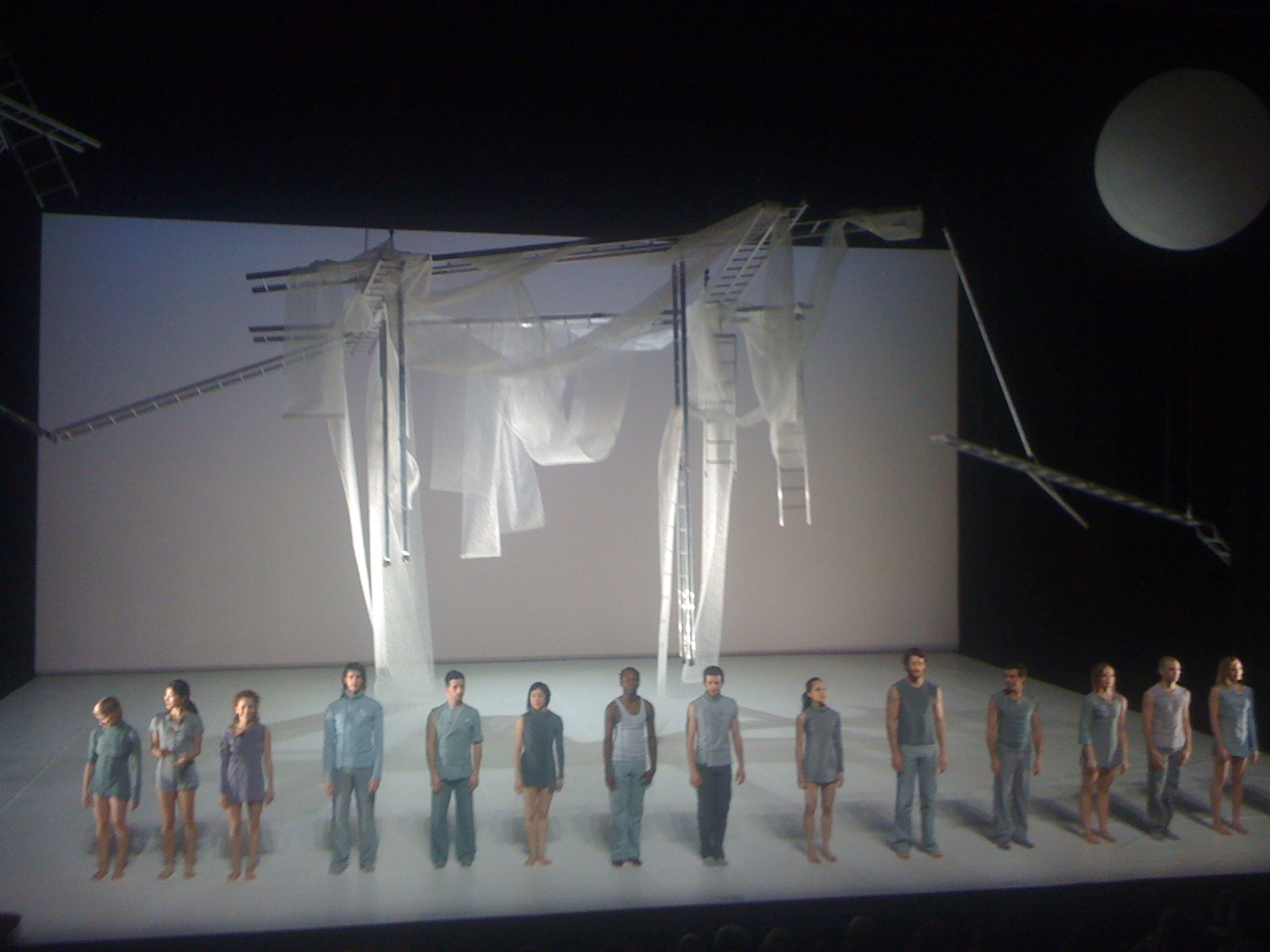
- La Vérité 25x par seconde The Truth 25 times a second Ballet National de Marseille installation by Ai Weiwei
- Born: 1946 (age 79–80); Brussels
- Occupation: Choreographer
- Known for: Charleroi / Danses

Frédéric Flamand (born 1946 in Brussels) is a Belgian actor, director, and choreographer.

== Biography ==
Flamand founded the Plan K contemporary dance company in 1973. From 1979, it occupied a former sugar refinery in Molenbeek. He was interested in interdisciplinary work and hosted artists such as Bob Wilson, William S. Burroughs, Steve Lacy, Decouflé, Marie Chouinard, Joy Division, and the Eurythmics.

As director and choreographer, Flamand worked with many architects, including Fabrizio Plessi, Elizabeth Diller, Ricardo Scofidio, Zaha Hadid, Jean Nouvel, Thom Mayne, and more recently, Dominique Perrault and the Campana brothers, working to connect the dancer's body to the surrounding architecture.

Flamand was appointed head of the former Royal Ballet of Wallonia in 1991 and renamed the company Charleroi / Danses. It became the first contemporary dance company in Belgium, and Flamand made the company well-known in Belgium and internationally. On February 28, 1998, Maurice Bejart was condemned by the Belgian courts for his choreography of Presbytery, which plagiarized an extract from Flamand's 1989 "The Fall of Icarus". The work has a winged dancer crossing the stage wearing video monitors as shoes.

In September 2004, Flamand was appointed manager of the Ballet National de Marseille and the Marseille National School of Dance. Eric Vu-An has been his assistant since 2005. He was appointed the artistic director of the International Dance Festival of in Cannes for the years 2011-2013.

== Selected works ==
With Theatre Laboratoire Vicinal

1972: "Lunapark" and "Tramp" (went on tour and performed at La MaMa Experimental Theatre Club in New York City)

With Plan K

1980: "Quarantine"

1984: "Scan Lines"

1987: "If Pyramids Were Square"

1989: "The Fall of Icarus" with Fabrizio Plessi

With Charleroi / Danses

1992: "Titanic" with Fabrizio Plessi

1994: "Ex Machina" with Fabrizio Plessi

1994: "Hull and Machinery"

1996: "Speed and Memory"

1996: "Moving Target" with Elizabeth Diller and Ricardo Scofidio

1998: "EJM 1 and 2" 'with Elizabeth Diller and Ricardo Scofidio

1998: "Gender"

2000: "Metapolis" with Zaha Hadid

2000: "The Future of Work" with Jean Nouvel

2001: "Body / Work / Leisure" with Jean Nouvel

2003: "Silent Collisions" with Thom Mayne

2005: "Eight" in collaboration with Marion Ballester

With the Ballet National de Marseille

2005: "The Radiant City" with Dominique Perrault

2006: "Metapolis II" with Zaha Hadid

2007: "Metamorphosis" with Humberto and Fernando Campana

2009: "The Trouble of Narcissus"

2010: "The Truth 25 times a second" with Ai Weiwei
