= Reed Phase =

1966 composition by Steve Reich

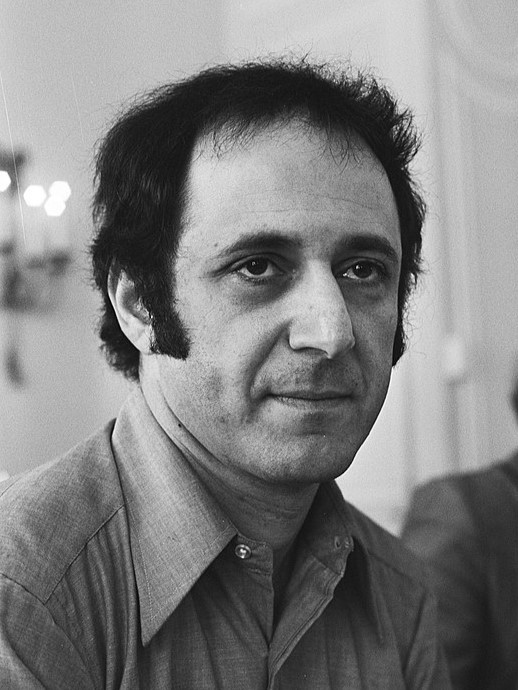
Steve Reich in 1976

Reed Phase, also called Three Reeds, is an early work by the American minimalist composer Steve Reich. It was written originally in 1966 for soprano saxophone and two soprano saxophones recorded on magnetic tape, titled at that time Saxophone Phase, and was later published in two versions: one for any reed instrument and tape (titled Reed Phase), the other for three reed instruments of exactly the same kind (in which case the title is Three Reeds). It was Reich's first attempt at applying his "phasing" technique, which he had previously used in the tape pieces It's Gonna Rain (1965) and Come Out (1966), to live performance.

== History ==
Reed Phase was composed in 1966 for Jon Gibson, the score having been finished in December 1966. The world premiere was given by Gibson in the art gallery of Fairleigh Dickinson University in New Jersey on January 5, 1967, under the title Saxophone Phase, and was repeated in New York at the Park Place Gallery on March 17, 1967. The score was published the next year in a version "for any reed instrument and two channel tape or three reeds", now retitled Reed Phase or Three Reeds.

Reed Phase is the first work in which Reich attempted to apply the discoveries of phasing made with the tape works It's Gonna Rain (1965) and Come Out (1966) to live performance. It represents a transitional stage in that it combined, in its original version, live instrumental performance and tape accompaniment. A technical difference between the tape and live mediums is that in the former, phasing was accomplished by slowing down one tape loop against the other, using the technique of flanging, whereas in the instrumental compositions it proved easier for one player to speed up against the other's fixed tempo. From the listener's point of view, however, the difference in effect is indistinguishable.

Reed Phase begins a sequence, followed directly by Piano Phase and Violin Phase (both 1967), in which the composer explores phasing technique for a single performer with tape and, in the case of Piano Phase, just two players. The two later compositions are among the most familiar of Reich's early works but Reed Phase has remained relatively unknown, in part because Reich soon came to regard it as a failure. Already with the publication of his collected Writings about Music in 1974, he excluded it from the compositions he regarded as "worth keeping", and never mentions the work in that book, even in passing. Later, Reich characterized the work as "discarded". The limited harmonic material aside, Reich had come to realise that unusual numbers of beats, such as the quintuple meter of Reed Phase, offered less than they initially suggested. In Piano Phase, work on which was already begun in late 1966, he chose a pattern of twelve eighth notes, subdivided into two groups of six, and began to discover the possibilities of metric reorientation which lay behind the potential subdivisions of a twelve-beat pattern. Twelve-unit rhythmic patterns

can divide up in very different ways; and that ambiguity as to whether you’re in duple or triple time is, in fact, the rhythmic life-blood of much of my music. In this way, one's listening mind can shift back and forth within the musical fabric, because the fabric encourages that. But if you don’t build in that flexibility of perspective, then you wind up with something extremely flat-footed and boring.

== Analysis ==
Reed Phase was originally composed for soprano saxophone and two saxophones pre-recorded on magnetic tape, under the title Saxophone Phase. By the time of its publication two years later the possible instrumentation had been extended to include "clarinet, oboe, accordion, reed organ, or any reed instrument that produces the four necessary pitches". It may also be played without tape on "any three reed instruments of exactly the same kind", in which case it is titled Three Reeds.

The composition is based on a five-note cell, or "basic unit", which is repeated continually throughout the entire work.

The basic unit is continually repeated by the instrumentalist and, because the performer must play without any interruption for at least five minutes, Reed Phase requires the use of circular breathing, instructions for which are given in the score. It is probably the first composition to require the use of circular breathing throughout the entire duration of the piece. Although the basic unit consists of five notes, the note A is used twice, so that there are only four pitches in all. The scale of the piece is therefore tetratonal, centered on the low D.

The work is composed in three sections. The first section is a cycle of phase shifts of the basic unit between the live instrument and one instrument on the tape. The reed instrument recorded on the tape repeats the basic unit in a fixed tempo, while the instrumentalist begins a cycle of phase shifts consisting of the soloist repeating the basic module a certain number of times, then accelerating the tempo until the shift against the steady part (tape or accompanying reed instrument) is increased by one eighth note, and then resuming the initial tempo for a certain number of repetitions in a constant relationship with the tape. The instrumentalist then accelerates again until the time lag is increased to a quarter note. This process is repeated until the starting point is reached once again, which is to say it returns to a unison (in phase) with the tape, which marks the end of the first cycle of phasing.

In the score, the gradual transitions are notated with dotted lines to indicate the acceleration made by the player against the fixed part(s), each synchronized stage in the sequence notated conventionally to show the new alignment. The performer is to resist the tendency to move directly from one eighth-note synchronization to the next. Instead, "he should attempt to move smoothly and continuously—the slower the better—spending due time within the 'irrational' relationships". Nevertheless, there is an alternation between periods of gradual dephasing and sections of temporary rhythmic stability. It is with this "stepped" characteristic that Reich's "live" process compositions most conspicuously differ from the "pure phasing" of the tape compositions, which have a slow and regular rate of change.

In the second section, a second instrument is added to the tape in a second channel, offset by one eighth note from the first recorded instrument. The live instrumentalist then performs a second cycle of phase shifts, reaching unison with channel 1 of the tape, and then moving ahead by one more eighth note to achieve unison with channel 2. At this point, the second channel fades out and the soloist continues the third section as a repeat of the first, until coming back into phase with the tape once again. After a few unison repetitions, both the performer and the tape stop simultaneously.

== Discography ==
- In Good Company. (With works by John Adams, Jon Gibson, Philip Glass, Terry Jennings, and Terry Riley.) Jon Gibson, saxophones, percussion, and keyboards; Martin Goldray, piano; Michael Riesman, keyboards; Bill Ruyle, percussion; John Snyder, conch shell & rainstick; LaMonte Young, piano. Recorded at The Looking Glass Studios, New York. Compact disc, 1 sound disc: digital; 4¾ in. Point Music 6042; Point Music 434 873–2. New York: Point Music, 1992.
- Early American Minimalism: Walls of Sound II. (With Reich, Pendulum Music, and works by Philip Glass and Terry Riley.) Ulrich Krieger, saxophone. Recorded at WW Studios, Berlin, 2002–2003. Compact disc, 1 sound disc: digital; 4¾ in. Sub Rosa SR218. [Brussels]: Sub Rosa, 2004.
