= Ballet National de Marseille =

Dance company based in Marseille, France

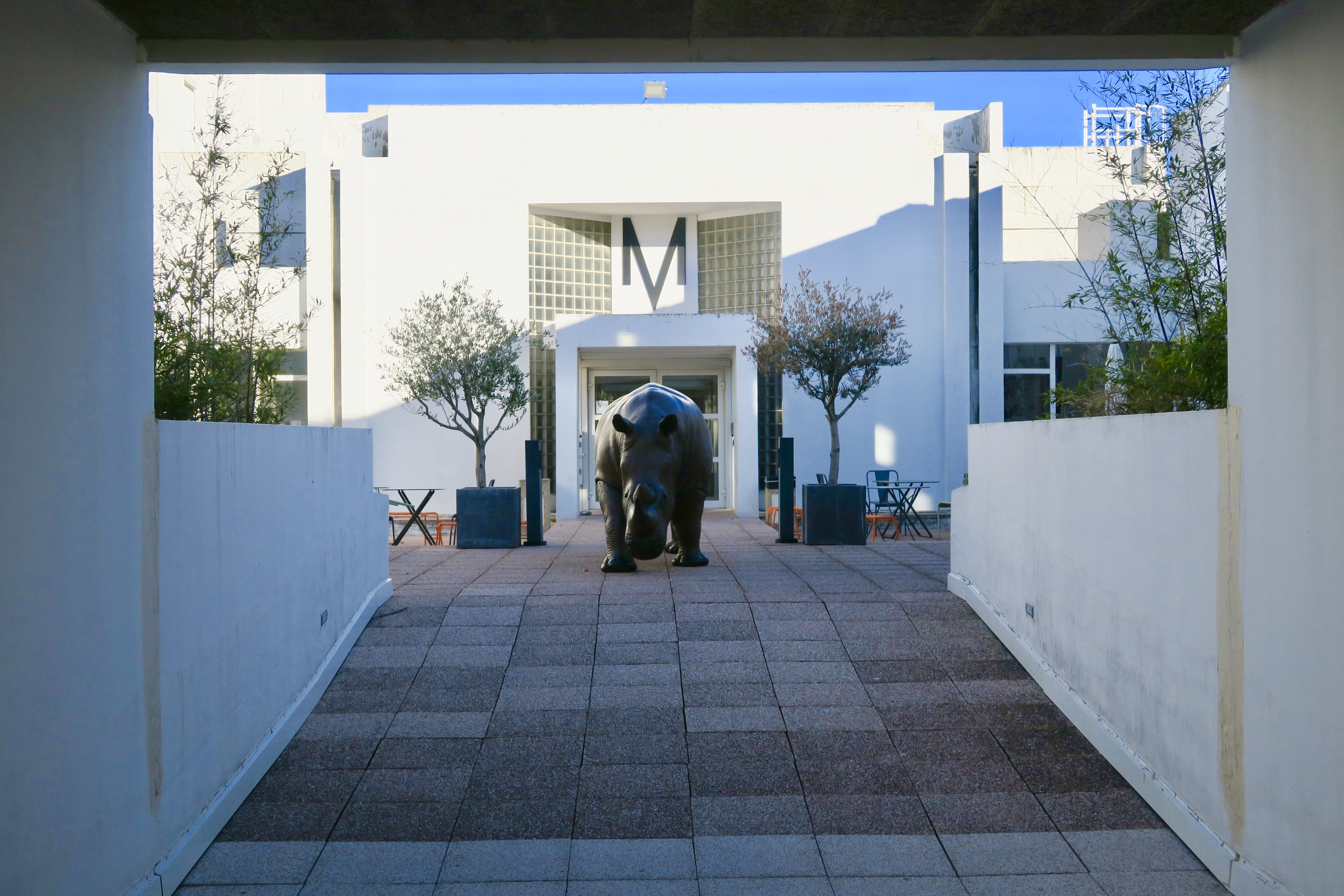

General information
- Name: Ballet National de Marseille
- Year founded: 1972
- Founders: Roland Petit
- Website: www.ballet-de-marseille.com

Senior staff
- Coordinator: Frédéric Flamand

The Ballet National de Marseille is a dance company based in Marseille, France. The company combines modern dance and classical ballet.

Since the tenure of Frédéric Flamand to (la)horde, it has been recognized as a leading contemporary dance company, expanding its repertoire beyond classical tradition to embrace multimedia and avant-garde creation.

== Overview ==
The Ballet National de Marseille was founded by the dancer and choreographer Roland Petit in 1972. The company's first production was the Pink Floyd Ballet. Roland Petit's young daughter had given him a Pink Floyd album and told him he should make a ballet from it. The idea matured, and the ballet eventually debuted in Marseille at the Palais des Sports. The band itself performed at the first show. Since then the Pink Floyd Ballet has been staged several times in cities around the world. Under Roland Petit the company's program included modern dance featuring Petit's wife Zizi Jeanmaire.

In 1992 the École Nationale Supérieure de Danse de Marseille (Marseille National Higher School of Dance) was established. The company and the school were housed in a new 6,000 square metres (65,000 sq ft) building with a 300-seat theater and nine rehearsal studios, two of which are reserved for the company. The company has a staff of 70, of whom half are dancers. The school has an intake of about 120 students each year, providing nine years of training in dance.

Marie-Claude Pietragalla was appointed Director General of the company and of the school in March 1998, holding this position until 2004. Frédéric Flamand was appointed artistic director in September 2004. Before this he had directed Charleroi Danses in Belgium from 1991 to 2004 and made that institution well known not only in Belgium but also internationally.

Appointed by the French Ministry of Culture and the City of Marseille, the collective (La)Horde took over the direction of the Ballet National de Marseille (National Choreographic Centre) on 2 September 2019.
