= Michèle Anne De Mey =

Belgian choreographer (born 1959)

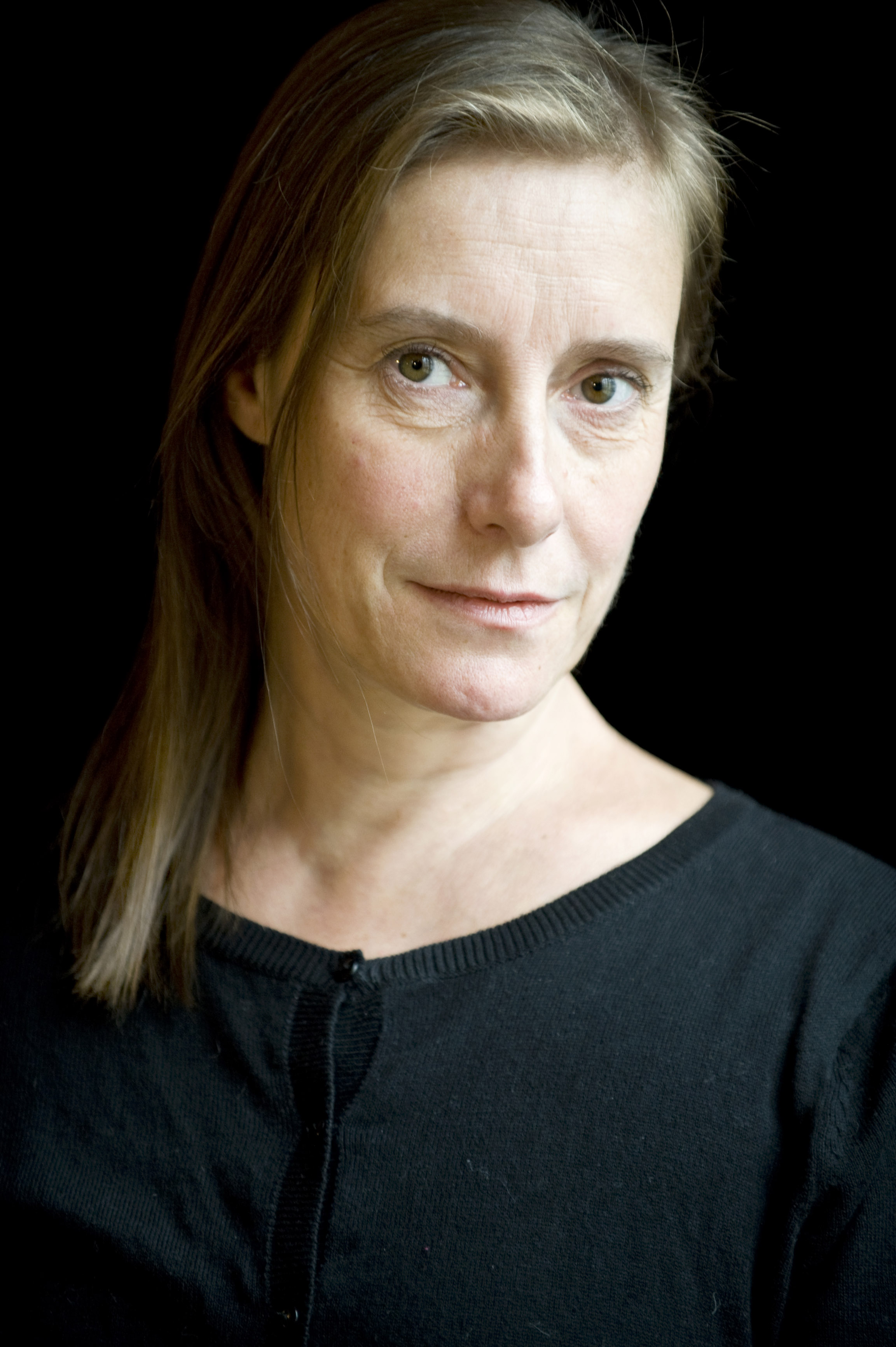
- De Mey in 2011
- Born: 21 July 1959 (age 66); Brussels, Belgium
- Education: École Mudra
- Occupations: Choreographer; dancer
- Years active: 1980–present
- Partner: Jaco Van Dormael (2000–present)
- Relatives: Thierry De Mey (brother)

Michèle Anne De Mey (born 21 July 1959) is a Belgian choreographer and dancer. She is associated with contemporary dance and interdisciplinary performance.

She served as the artistic director of Charleroi Danses, the choreography centre of the Fédération Wallonie-Bruxelles.

== Career ==
De Mey studied at the École Annie Flore in Brussels before attending the École Mudra from 1976 to 1979. She first collaborated with choreographer Anne Teresa De Keersmaeker and performed in several of her works, including Fase (1982) and Rosas danst Rosas (1983). She was one of the four founding members of the dance company Rosas alongside De Keersmaeker, Fumiyo Ikeda, and Adriana Boriello.

Her first choreography was Passé simple (1981). With Sinfonia eroïca (1990), De Mey founded her own company Astragale. She also choreographed two films directed by her brother Thierry De Mey, Love Sonnets (1993) and 21 études à danser (1999). In July 2005, she became the artistic director of Charleroi Danses of the Fédération Wallonie-Bruxelles.

Since 2010, De Mey has collaborated extensively with director Jaco Van Dormael on a series of interdisciplinary productions combining dance, cinema and live performance. These include Kiss & Cry (2011), Cold Blood (2016) and Amor (2017), which integrate choreography with miniature sets and real-time film projection.

== Style ==
De Mey's choreographic work explores the relationship between the body and everyday movement, incorporating elements of repetition, fragmentation and visual storytelling. Her later collaborations have been associated with forms of intermedial theatre that combine live performance with cinematic techniques.

== Selected works ==
- Fase (1982), Bourse Theater, Brussels; with Anne Teresa De Keersmaeker
- Rosas danst Rosas (1983), Kaaitheater, Brussels
- Kiss & Cry (2011), Le Manège de Mons, Mons; co-created with Jaco Van Dormael
- Cold Blood (2016), Théâtre de Namur, Namur; co-created with Jaco Van Dormael
- Amor (2017), Théâtre National, Brussels; co-created with Jaco Van Dormael
