= Ann Veronica Janssens =

British artist

Ann Veronica Janssens (born July 30, 1956) is a Belgian contemporary visual artist based in Brussels, Belgium. She lives and works in Brussels, Belgium. Her work is an invitation to ephemeral experiences, which are at times delirious or vertiginous using sculpture materials with light and space to give the viewer an outer world experience with their senses.

Janssens co-founded Brain Space Laboratory in 2009, where studies and talks were presented with research on topics such as biology, art history, and philosophy. She started working with Kamel Mennour in 2012.

Janssens was also appointed Head of the Studio at the Beaux-Arts de Paris in 2012.

== Early life ==
Having grown up in Kinshasa, a city in Congo, until she was twelve, Janssens became interested in the lights within the city, such as on the water or in the sky. With her father as an architect and her mother working in an art gallery, she was exposed to construction sights and artworks. The combination of light and structure is a part of her artwork. Originally, she wanted to be an architect, like her father, but she began to move away from this discipline as it struck her as rather too functional.

Janssens attended La Cambre National School of Visual Arts in Brussels and worked as an assistant at the school with Maria Wierusz Kowalski (Tapta Workshop).

== Artistic work ==
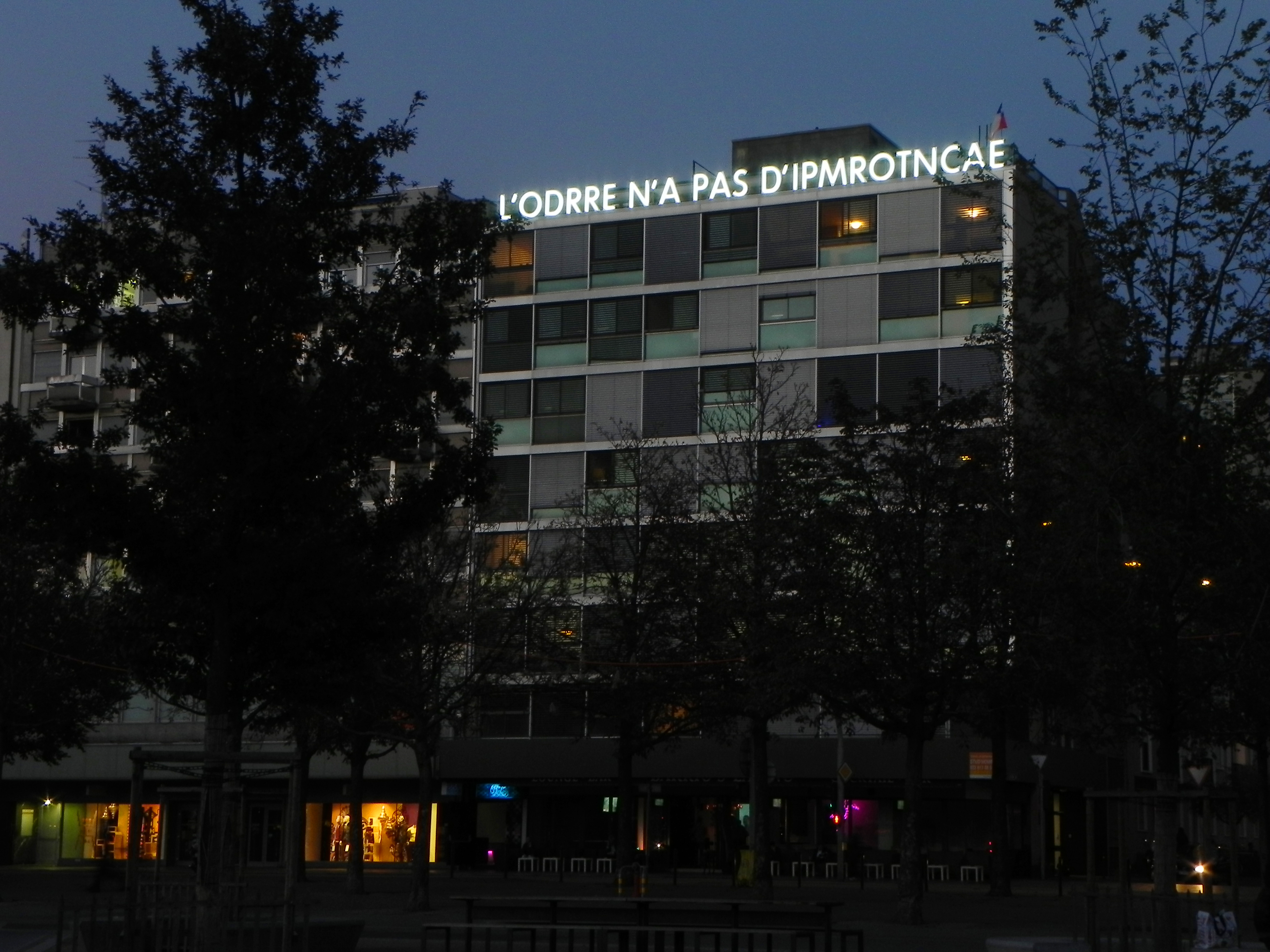
Ann Veronica Janssens, L'odrre n'as pas d'ipmrotncae, 2012. is part of the public art project The Neon Parallax in Geneva

Doing mainly site-specific work, Janssens takes a specific space as her starting point and adds forms and volumes to the existing architecture. Her interventions bring the specific qualities of an environment to light. She sets out signposts intended to let viewers define themselves against reality. For a public space art project such as the Neon Parallax in Geneva, for example, she used a misspelled text found on the ground as a starting point for a large neon installation on the rooftop of a building.

Before 1990, Janssen's mediums were industrial materials such as concrete and glass, creating "super spaces" structures that look like architectural works that use space and matter to experiment with perception. Janssens' mediums evolved, using light, colors, space, sound, and artificial fog in combination with her early architectural work.

Even if she has a studio, Janssens often rents out other studios and lighting equipment as well as experts to help her set up her site-specific work.

== Artists books ==
Some books include images of Janssens's works, such as experienced (1979) which are written by her and include a more personal look at images in her artwork. As well as texts that include introductions of Janssens by other authors.

- 8'26", Notes by Ann Veronica Janssens and Michel François, Musée d'Art Contemporain, Marseille, 2004
- Ann Veronica Janssens: experienced. Castello: Espai d'art contemporani; Basel: Basel Publishing, 2009
- Ann Veronica Janssens: Serendipity. Brussels: Wiels, 2011.
- Ann Veronica Janssens, Chapelle Saint-Vincent, Grignan. Antwerp: Ronny Van de Velde, 2013 (artist's book)
- Ann Veronica Janssens, September. Corte: FRAC Corse, 2014.
- Ann Veronica Janssens & Ayse Erkmen, Various. Ghent: SMAK, 2015.

== Select exhibitions ==
Janssens has been in over 100 exhibitions that include international and solo exhibitions

- Lux Perpetua, 47 rue Saint-André-des-Arts, Paris 6 (2012) Mennour
- Ann Veronica Janssens, 47 rue Saint-André-des-Arts, Paris 6 (2023) Mennour
- Winter Show, 47 rue Saint-Andre-des-Arts, Paris 6 (2015-2016) Mennour
- Ann Veronica Janssens, 6 rue de Pont de Lodi, Paris 6 (2016) Mennour
- airs, 47 rue Saint-André-des-Arts, Paris 6 (2021) Mennour
- Landscape of Geometry, 6 rue de Pont de Lodi, Paris 6 (2021) Mennour
- White Days, 47 rue Saint-André-des-Arts, Paris 6, 28 avenue Matignon, Paris 8 (2021-2022) Mennour
- Light & Space, Copenhagen Contemporary (2021-2022) Curated by Aukje Lepoutre Ravn
- 5677 Chemin Des Trious, Collection Lambert (Avignon) and Foundation CAB (Saint-Paul-de-Vence) (2022) Curated by Stéphane Ibars
- Endless Summer, Mennour, 47 rue Saint-André-des-Arts, Paris 6 (2022) Curated by Christian Alandete
- Between dusk and sky, Collection Lambert (2022) Curated by René Char
- 23:56:04, Pantheon, Paris (2022)
- Under the Pattern - The Structures of Abstraction, Tours Société Générale (2022)
- The Pieces I Am, UCCA Edge, Shanghai (2022-2023) Curated by Liya Han, Yoojin Tang and Iris Long
- Women in Abstraction, West Bund Museum, Shanghai (2022-2023)
- Grand Bal, Pirelli HangarBicocca, Milan (2023) Curated by Roberta Tenconi
- Money in Art, Monnaie de Paris (2023) Organized by Monnaie de Paris
- pinkyellowblue, M WOODS 7980, Beijing (2023) Curated by Victor Wang

== Personal life ==
Her partner, Michel François whom she worked and lived with for many years, had a daughter Léone François
