= Fumiyo Ikeda =

Japanese dancer, actress and choreographer

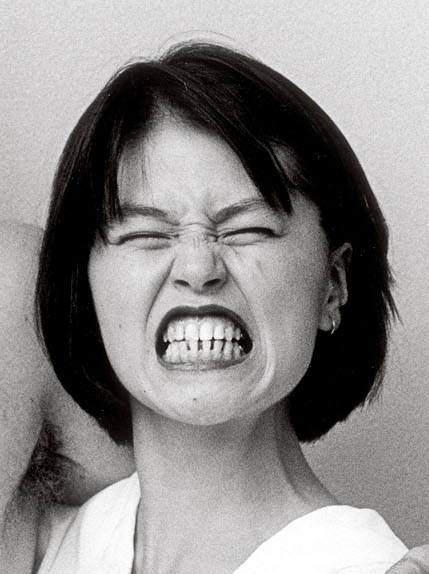
- Born: Osaka, Japan

Fumiyo Ikeda is a Japanese dancer, actress, and choreographer.

== Training ==
Fumiyo Ikeda was born in Osaka and grew up in Fukui, Japan. She started ballet at the age of ten. In 1979 she moved to Europe and started studying at Mudra, the Brussels dance school that was founded by Maurice Béjart. There she met Anne Teresa De Keersmaeker, whom she joined when she founded her dance company Rosas.

== Collaboration with Anne Teresa De Keersmaeker / Rosas ==
Ikeda was involved in the creation of almost all Rosas productions from 1983 to 1992 and also was a dancer in them. In 1997 she joined Rosas again. Until 2008 she danced in most Rosas productions. Afterwards she went on tour with the restaging of older Rosas productions, such as Woud, Drumming, Elena's Aria and Mozart / Concert Arias. Un moto di gioia.

== Work as a choreographer ==
Around the end of her second period at Rosas, Ikeda began to create work that is based on her own ideas. First she did that together with Alain Platel and Benjamin Verdonck in Nine Finger (2007), which is based on the book Beasts of No Nation by Uzodinma Iweala and shows the perversity of the war through the eyes of a child soldier. The production was selected for the Festival d'Avignon 2007. A few years later in pieces (2009) followed, a performance she made with the British writer / performance artist Tim Etchells about memory, remembering and forgetting, and about how both are experienced and shown by the body and expressed in language. Together with the Japanese dancer Un Yamada, she created in 2014 the dance duet amness, with organ music by Johann Sebastian Bach being played by the saxophonists of the Bl!ndman ensemble. In the same year she also created the production Cross Grip with the Japanese dancers Llon Kawai, Ayaka Azechi, Kota Kihara and the percussionist Kuniko Kato. Nine Finger (2007) was restaged in 2016; Stijn Opstaele replaced Benjamin Verdonck. In 2017 another dance performance followed: Piano and String Quartet, with a live performance by Ictus Ensemble of the composition Piano and String Quartet by Morton Feldman.

== Other collaborations ==
After her departure from Rosas around 1992, Fumiyo Ikeda began exploring new horizons. Before she had already collaborated with the American choreographer / dancer Steve Paxton. She participated in theater and film productions like Vinaya (Josse De Pauw and Peter van Kraaij, 1992), De meid slaan (Josse De Pauw and Tom Jansen, 1993), and Snakesong / Le voyeur (Jan Lauwers / Needcompany, 1994). Much later she worked with the Nature Theater of Oklahoma on the production Life & Times Episode 2 (2010). More recently she worked on Absence (Eric Joris and Peter Verhelst / NTGent, 2015), and on De Sleutel (Josse De Pauw / LOD, 2016).

== Teaching ==
Besides dancing and choreographing, FIkeda also gives various workshops on her own work and the Rosas repertoire (including movement material from Rosas danst Rosas and Drumming). She does this regularly at the Summer School of the dance school PARTS. Several times she was also a teacher at KASK, Ghent. At Rosas she leads the rehearsals for the restaging of the early productions.

== Productions ==
Own work:

- Nine Finger (Fumiyo Ikeda, Alain Platel and Benjamin Verdonck, 2007)
- in pieces (Fumiyo Ikeda and Tim Etchells, 2010)
- amness (Fumiyo Ikeda and Un Yamada, 2014)
- Piano and String Quartet (Fumiyo Ikeda and Ictus, 2017)

With Anne Teresa De Keersmaeker / Rosas:

- Rosas danst Rosas (Anne Teresa De Keersmaeker / Rosas, 1983)
- Elena's Aria (Anne Teresa De Keersmaeker / Rosas, 1984)
- Bartók / Aantekeningen (Anne Teresa De Keersmaeker / Rosas, 1986)
- Bartók / Mikrokosmos (Anne Teresa De Keersmaeker / Rosas, 1987)
- Ottone Ottone (Anne Teresa De Keersmaeker / Rosas, 1988)
- Stella (Anne Teresa De Keersmaeker / Rosas, 1990)
- Achterland (Anne Teresa De Keersmaeker / Rosas, 1990)
- Toccata (Anne Teresa De Keersmaeker / Rosas, 1993)
- Just before (Anne Teresa De Keersmaeker / Rosas, 1997)
- Drumming (Anne Teresa De Keersmaeker / Rosas, 1998)
- I said I (Anne Teresa De Keersmaeker / Rosas, 1999)
- In real time (Anne Teresa De Keersmaeker / Rosas / tg stan / AKA Moon, 2000)
- Rain (Anne Teresa De Keersmaeker / Rosas / Ictus, 2001)
- (but if a look should) April me (Anne Teresa De Keersmaeker / Rosas, 2002)
- Repertory Evening (Anne Teresa De Keersmaeker / Rosas, 2002)
- Bitches Brew / Tacoma Narrows (Anne Teresa De Keersmaeker / Rosas, 2003)
- Kassandra - speaking in twelve voices (Anne Teresa De Keersmaeker / Rosas, 2004)
- Raga for the Rainy Season / A Love Supreme (Anne Teresa De Keersmaeker / Rosas, 2005)
- D'un soir un jour (Anne Teresa De Keersmaeker / Rosas, 2006)
- Zeitung (Anne Teresa De Keersmaeker / Rosas / Alain Franco, 2008)

With others:

- Flip Side (Steve Paxton, 1989)
- De meid slaan (Josse De Pauw and Tom Jansen, 1993)
- Snakesong / Le voyeur (Jan Lauwers / Needcompany, 1994)
- Life & Times Episode 2 (Nature Theater of Oklahoma, 2010)
- Absence (Eric Joris and Peter Verhelst / NTGent, 2015)
- De Sleutel (Josse De Pauw / LOD, 2016)

== Filmography ==
With Rosas:

- Répétitions (Marie André, 1985)
- Hoppla! (Wolfgang Kolb, 1989)
- Monoloog van Fumiyo Ikeda op het einde van Ottone, Ottone (Walter Verdin, 1989)
- Ottone / Ottone (part I and II) (Walter Verdin and Anne Teresa De Keersmaeker, 1991)
- Rosa (Peter Greenaway, 1992)
- Achterland (Anne Teresa De Keersmaeker and Herman Van Eyken, 1994)
- Counter Phrases (Thierry De Mey, 2004)

With others:

- Solum solum, alleen maar aarde (Bie Boeykens, 1992)
- Vinaya (Josse De Pauw and Peter van Kraaij, 1992)
