= Rosas danst Rosas =

1997 dance by Anne Teresa de Keersmaeker

- Choreographer: Anne Teresa de Keersmaeker
- Music: Thierry De Mey
- Premiere: Théâtre de la Balsamine, Brussels
- Original ballet company: Rosas

Rosas danst Rosas (lit. translation: Roses Dances Roses) is a contemporary dance choreographed by Anne Teresa de Keersmaeker. It premiered as part of the Kaaitheater Festival in May, 1983 at the Théâtre de la Balsamine, Brussels. Originally created with and danced by four dancers (Adriana Borriello, Fumiyo Ikeda, Michèle Anne De Mey, and Anne Teresa de Keersmaeker), it is now performed by a rotating cast from Rosas (the dance company formed by de Keersmaeker in 1983).

== Background ==
Rosas danst Rosas was de Keersmaeker's third work, and the formative work for the company Rosas, which was founded in 1983. Thierry De Mey and de Keersmaeker had worked closely together on de Keersmaeker's previous work, Fase, and decided to compose a piece together. This meant that they had to write the music and the dance at the same time, rather than compose the dance to already existing music. De Mey's only prior experience of making music was as a guitar player with a rock band, and de Keersmaeker had choreographed Asch and Fase. De Keersmaker has stated that the most important connotation of the name Rosas, to her, is that "it refers to women, as the name Rosa is a woman's name. The title of the piece, "Rosas danst Rosas", meant we dance ourselves, and repetition was already contained in the title."

=== Rosas ===
Anne Teresa de Keersmaeker created the dance and production team Rosas, and over the past 32 years the ensemble has won numerous awards and performed in many countries. Rosas describes its dance as "pure writing with movement in time and space" and says that "At its heart lies the relationship between movement and music. In some productions, the relationship between dance and text is also examined."

== Structure ==
It was by suggestion from De Mey that the dance was structured around the phases of a day. The first movement represents the nighttime, the second is the morning, and the third is afternoon. For the fourth movement, the dancers go into a kind of overdrive; as de Keersmaeker puts it, "The fourth movement is a paroxysm of dancing, dancing, dancing without counting, over and over again, a kind of dépense." Over the course of the piece, the dancers split into many different combinations (e.g. 3–1, 1-2-1, 1-1-2, etc.), and become physically exhausted. Anne Teresa de Keersmaker herself stated that, "We exploit every possible division and combination of four dancers, also the space in straight lines, diagonals, and finally a closed circle."

== Reception ==
The piece has been described as many things; as Roslyn Sulcas wrote to The New York Times readership, "Riveting and exhausting, fascinating and relentless, brilliant and tedious, it is a mesmerizing exploration in synchronicity, patterning and rhythm." Part of the reason for these contrasts is the very act that there is no exact 'right' or 'wrong' interpretation: it is what it is. This being the case, it is not uncommon for audience members to walk out of the performance, particularly during the first act, as the four women are rolling on the floor and utilizing repetitive movements. Luke Jennings, of the Observer, wrote that when de Keersmaeker launched her company in 1983, it was her musicality and "pure, dance minimalism" that won her attention, and that although 'Fase' "used repetition to an almost hallucinatory effect... Rosas danst Rosas remains the more confrontational of the two, retaining its power to baffle, frustrate, and intrigue."

== Contributors and awards ==
Choreography: Anne Teresa de Keersmaeker

Music: Thierry De Mey, Peter Vermeersch

Costumes: Rosas

Awards: Bessie Awards for the light design (1987) and choreography (1987) in New York. The dance was also awarded the Eve du Spectacle by L'Association des Journalistes du Spectacle (1989).

Film adaptations: Thierry De Mey filmed a screen adaptation of the dance in 1997. This version was filmed in the old building of the technical school of architect Henry Van de Velde in Leuven. It is shorter than the actual stage production, and includes more members of the company than the usual four dancers.

== Plagiarism controversy ==
In 2011 the pop star Beyoncé was accused by Anne Teresa de Keersmaeker of plagiarizing dance moves from both Rosas danst Rosas (1983) and Achterland (1990). De Keersmaeker said in an interview, "I'm not mad, but this is plagiarism... This is stealing.' she later stated that 'It's a bit rude... What's rude is that they don't even bother about hiding it.' As James McKinley Jr. noted in his article for the New York Times, 'The dancer's in Beyoncé's video not only share some dance moves with the "Rosas danst Rosas" piece, but also the costumes, the set and even some specific shots resemble a film of the dance made by Thierry De Mey...' Beyoncé's response to de Keersmaeker's comments was 'Clearly, the ballet 'Rosas danst Rosas' was one of many references for my video 'Countdown'. It was one of the inspirations used to bring the feel and look of the song to life.'

De Keersmaeker's initial response to the 'Countdown' video was as follows:

'Like so many people, I was extremely surprised when I got a message through Facebook about the special appearance of my two choreographies – Rosas danst Rosas (1983) and Achterland (1990) in Beyoncé’s new videoclip Countdown. I was asked if I were now selling out Rosas into the commercial circuit… When I saw the actual video, I was struck by the resemblance of Beyoncé’s clip not only with the movements from Rosas danst Rosas, but also with the costumes, the set and even the shots from the film by Thierry De Mey. Obviously, Beyoncé, or the video clip director Adria Petty, plundered many bits of the integral scenes in the film...'

De Keersmaeker stressed that she was not angry, and ended her statement by saying:

'Beyond resemblance there is also one funny coincidence. Everyone told me, she is dancing and she is four months pregnant. In 1996, when De Mey‘s film was made, I was also pregnant with my second child. So, today, I can only wish her the same joy that my daughter brought me.

Anne Teresa De Keersmaeker

October 10, 2011'
