= Harold Ancart =

Belgian painter and sculptor (born 1980)

- Born: 1980 (age 45–46)
- Education: La Cambre, Brussels, Belgium
- Occupations: Painter, sculptor

Harold Ancart (born 1980) is a Belgian painter and sculptor. He currently lives and works in New York City.

== Education ==
Harold Ancart studied at La Cambre in Brussels, Belgium where he received a M.F.A in 2007.

== Major works ==
=== "Untitled (the great night)" – Painting the night – Group Show at Centre Pompidou-Metz, France (2018) ===
Harold Ancart created a 15 by 44 feet site-specific painting for the Shigeru Ban designed front window of the Centre Pompidou-Metz during the group show "Painting the Night" that was shown from October 13, 2018, to April 15, 2019.

=== "Subliminal Standard" – Public Art Fund project in Brooklyn, New York (2019) ===
He painted a freestanding, 16-foot-high concrete sculpture paying tribute to handball courts in Cadman Plaza, Brooklyn with the support of Public Art Fund that will be on view from May 1, 2019 to March 1, 2020.

== Collections ==
Harold Ancart's work is held in the following public collections:

- Whitney Museum of American Art, New York
- Solomon R. Guggenheim Museum, New York
- Los Angeles County Museum of Art, Los Angeles
- Beyeler Foundation, Basel
- Musée d'Art Moderne de la Ville de Paris, Paris
- National Gallery of Canada, Ottawa
- Louis Vuitton Foundation, Paris
- Menil Collection, Houston
- Hirshhorn Museum and Sculpture Garden, Washington DC
- Museum of Contemporary Art, Los Angeles
- Albright–Knox Art Gallery, Buffalo
- Louisiana Museum of Modern Art, Copenhagen
- Lenbachhaus, Munich
- Stedelijk Museum voor Actuele Kunst, Ghent
- K11 Art Foundation, Hong Kong
- Yuz Museum Shanghai, Shanghai
- Rubell Museum, Miami
