= Thierry De Mey =

Belgian composer and filmmaker

Thierry De Mey (born 28 February 1956 in Brussels) is a Belgian composer, filmmaker, and choreographer.

== Biography ==
De Mey is the founder of the contemporary music ensemble Maximalist!, and he has participated in other important projects such as Musique Nouvelles and Ictus Ensemble, for which he has composed several works. In 1993 he joined a class at IRCAM, where he developed his interest in electronic music. He was composer in residence at the Conservatory of Strasbourg and the Musica Festival in 2001 and 2002. Since 2005, he has been one of four new directors of Charleroi Danses, coordinating the multidisciplinary activities of the center choreography.

== Main compositions ==
- 1983: Rosas danst Rosas, ballet music for Anne Teresa De Keersmaeker's Rosas Company
- 1985: Musique de tables, for three percussionists (for Wim Vandekeybus' Ultima Vez group)
- 1990: Undo, monody for piano
- 1991: Chaîne, for 2 pianos
- 1991: Ice, duet for violin and violoncello (for Ultima Vez)
- 1991: Movement No.3 for string quartet
- 1991: String Quartet No.1
- 1993: Kinok (for Rosas Company)
- 1993: Passacaglia and variations for violin
- 1994: Amor constante más allá de la muerte (for Rosas Company)
- 1995: Concerto for violin and ensemble
- 1995: Unknowness, for percussionists and sampled sounds
- 1996: Tippeke (for Rosas Company)
- 2002: Palindrome, hoket in 8
- 2002: Water, for 6 percussionists, violoncello, electronic and sampled sounds
- 2003: Élastique, electronic composition
- 2004: Landscape 1, electronic composition

== Main films ==
- 1984: Floréal (documentary)
- 1993: Love Sonnets, with Michèle Anne De Mey
- 1996: Rosas danst Rosas, with Anne Teresa, Baroness de Keersmaeker and Rosas Company
- 1996: Tippeke, with Anne Teresa De Keersmaeker
- 1998: 21 études à danser, with Michèle Anne De Mey
- 1998: Musique de tables, with Wim Vandekeybus' group
- 1999: Barbes Bleues
- 2000: Dom Svobode, with Iztok Kovač
- 2001: Ma mère l'Oye, with Anne Teresa De Keersmaeker, Michèle Anne De Mey, Sidi Larbi Cherkaoui and others.
- 2002: Fase, with Anne Teresa De Keersmaeker and Michèle Anne De Mey
- 2004: Counter Phrases, group of ten filmed choreographies, with Anne Teresa De Keersmaeker and Rosas Company.

== See also ==
- List of Belgian film directors
