= Anne Teresa De Keersmaeker =

Contemporary dance choreographer (born 1960)

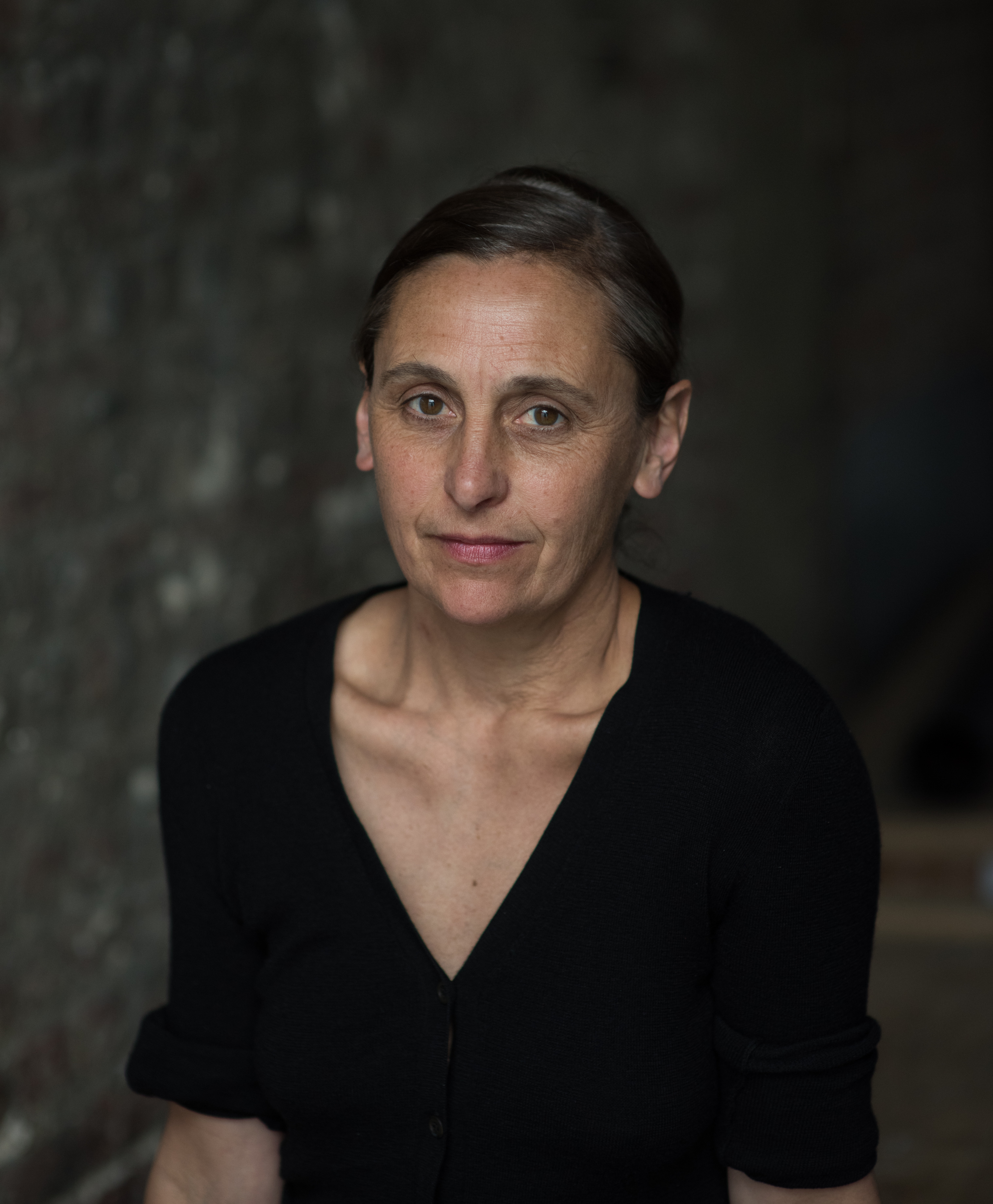
- Anne Teresa De Keersmaeker in 2016
- Born: 1960 (age 65–66); Mechelen, Belgium
- Occupations: Dancer, choreographer

Anne Teresa, Baroness De Keersmaeker (Dutch pronunciation: [ˈɑnə teːˈreːzaː dəˈkeːrsmaːkər], born 1960 in Mechelen, Belgium, grew up in Wemmel) is a contemporary dance choreographer. The dance company constructed around her, Rosas, was in residence at La Monnaie in Brussels from 1992 to 2007.

== Biography ==
De Keersmaeker did not study dance until her last year of high school, instead studying music, specifically the flute. She studied from 1978 to 1980 at the Mudra School in Brussels, a school with links to La Monnaie and to Maurice Béjart's Ballet of the 20th Century. She has said that the percussionist and her music teacher at MUDRA, Fernand Schirren, was a major influence on her. In 1981, she attended the Tisch School of the Arts at New York University. While at the Tisch, she presented her first production, Asch (1980), in Brussels. In 1982 upon her return from the U.S.A. she created Fase, four movements to the music of Steve Reich. It was this production that brought her "a breakthrough on the international dance scene, performing, among other places, at the Avignon Festival".

The success of Fase contributed largely to the foundation of the Rosas in 1983. Rosas danst Rosas, de Keersmaeker's first choreography for the young company to new compositions of Thierry De Mey and Peter Vermeersch, brought Rosas the international breakthrough as a company. During the eighties, Rosas was supported by Kaaitheater of Brussels (director Hugo De Greef). Within the framework of Kaaitheater, her oeuvre took shape. Performances such as Elena's Aria (1984), Bartók/Aantekeningen (1986), a staging of Heiner Müller's triptych Verkommenes Ufer/Medeamaterial Landschaft mit Argonauten (1987), Mikrokosmos-Monument Selbstporträt mit Reich und Riley (und Chopin ist auch dabei)/In zart fliessender Bewegung - Quatuor Nr.4, (1987), Ottone, Ottone (1988), Stella (1990) and Achterland (1990), were produced in collaboration with Kaaitheater.

In 1992, La Monnaie's general director Bernard Foccroulle invited Rosas to become the resident company of Brussels' Royal Opera De Munt/La Monnaie. At the start of the residency, de Keersmaeker set herself three objectives: to intensify the relation between dance and music, to build a repertory, and to launch a dance school (after the disappearance of MUDRA from Brussels in 1988). That year, Rosas created ERTS and released Rosa—a film of a choreography by Anne Teresa De Keersmaeker to Bartók music directed by Peter Greenaway. Later that year, Rosas created Mozart Concert Arias, un moto di gioia for the Avignon Festival. A production made in collaboration with the Orchestre des Champs Elysées, directed by Philippe Herreweghe.

In 1993, Rosas created Toccata, to the music of J.S. Bach, for the Holland Festival. In May 1994, the KunstenFESTIVALdes Arts in Brussels premièred Kinok, produced in collaboration with Thierry De Mey and the Ictus Ensemble. At the end of 1994, this collaboration resulted in a new creation: Amor Constante más allá de la muerte. In November 1995, La Monnaie premièred Verklärte Nacht, a choreography that was part of a production of Schönberg music Erwartung/Verklärte Nacht.

In 1995, Rosas and La Monnaie launched in Brussels a new international school for contemporary dance, the Performing Arts Research and Training Studios (PARTS), where sixty students coming from some 25 countries are trained, over a three-year period, by more than 50 teachers.

In December 1996, Woud, three movements to the music of Berg, Schönberg & Wagner was premiered in Seville. At the beginning of 1997, de Keersmaeker created, together with Steve Paxton and The Wooster Group, 3 solos for Vincent Dunoyer. In November 1997, Just Before, to a live performance by the Ictus Ensemble of music composed by Magnus Lindberg, John Cage, Iannis Xenakis, Steve Reich, Pierre Bartholomée and Thierry De Mey, was presented in La Monnaie.

In February 1998, de Keersmaeker made her debut as an opera director at La Monnaie with Bartók's Duke Bluebeard's Castle. In August 1998, the Impuls Festival in Vienna premièred Drumming, a production to Steve Reich's composition of the same name. In November 1998 she created The Lisbon Piece, for the Portuguese Companhia Nacional de Bailado: her first experience as a guest choreographer.

In March 1999, de Keersmaeker created, together with Rosas dancer Cynthia Loemij, and Jolente De Keersmaeker and Frank Vercruyssen from the theatre company STAN, Quartett; a dance-theatre performance based on the text by Heiner Müller. One month later, she choreographed and danced a duet with Elizabeth Corbett for the production with/for/by. In May 1999, Rosas premiered I said I, a collaboration with Jolente De Keersmaeker for the direction, with the Ictus Ensemble, Aka Moon and DJ Grazzhoppa for the music composition and execution. Jan Joris Lamers designed the set and lighting and Dries van Noten the costumes. For In Real Time in 2000, Rosas again collaborated with Stan, as well as with the jazz-ensemble Aka Moon for the composition and live interpretation of the music. In January 2001, de Keersmaeker created Rain, another performance to a score by Steve Reich, his Music for 18 Musicians.

2002 saw the celebration of twenty years of Rosas and ten years of residence at La Monnaie, with the re-run of the text-pieces, the creation of (but if a look should) April me and Rain live, the two latter accompanied by Brussels contemporary music ensemble Ictus. A 336 pages book Rosas, if and only if wonder was published and a multimedia exhibition was organised in newly opened halls at the Centre for Fine Arts, Brussels, and was attended by over 15,000 people. Once, a solo to the music of Joan Baez, concluded the celebration year's performances.

2003 showed yet a new evolution: whereas in the past her choreographies had been very precise and closely linked to the music, in Bitches Brew / Tacoma Narrows, De Keersmaeker for the first time allowed improvisation by her dancers during the performance. Over the past years, Rosas has also revived several earlier pieces: Rosas danst Rosas, Fase, Mikrokosmos, Achterland and others. Rosas' productions have been invited by theatres and festivals across five continents.

In October 2011, De Keersmaeker's choreography from "Rosas Danst Rosas" and "Achterland" was sampled without permission by the R&B singer Beyoncé in the music video for the single Countdown.

In July 2021, she founded the ATDK Foundation a foundation with the intent of safeguarding her artistic legacy, and enable her to share her artistic excellence.

In June 2024, the Belgian newspaper De Standaard published an extensive article on its website revealing major accusations against the choreographer and, in particular, her working methods and managerial leadership including authoritarianism, bullying and bodyshaming. The article was based on the attestations from the present and former company dancers, as well as other company's employees. In the course of the COVID-19 pandemic, she is said to have put the health of company dancers at risk on several occasions. Rosas then published a general statement recognizing the importance of well-being in the work environment and expressing the belief that artistic work must be created in a safe and respectful environment. A direct response to the accusations was rejected with reference to healing conversations, Keersmaeker did not personally respond to the accusations.

== Awards ==
Both the performances and the films of de Keersmaeker have been distinguished by various international awards. Rosas danst Rosas won the Bessie Award (1987), Mikrokosmos received a Japanese Dance Award for the best foreign production (1989), Stella got the London Dance and Performances Award (1989), Drumming was prized with the Golden Laurel Wreath for the best choreography in Sarajevo (October 1998). In 2011, she received the American Dance Festival Award for her career and at this occasion presented one of her seminal work Rosas danst Rosas (1983).

The film Hoppla! was awarded a Sole d'Oro in Italy and the Grand Prix Vidéo Danse in Sète (1989). The film Rosa has been distinguished by a Dance Screen Award, got a Special Jury Commendation in the Black and White Short Film Competition at the Film Festival in Cork and was selected for the 49th Mostra Interazionale d'Arte Cinematografica in Venice (1992). In 1994, in Lyon, a Dance Screen Award was offered to the film Achterland (1994), while the film Rosas danst Rosas obtained the Grand Prix International Vidéo Danse in 1997 and the special prize of the Jury of the International Festival of Film and New Media on Art in Athens in 1998. In 2000, the short film Tippeke got the Grand Prix Carina Ari of the Festival International Media Dance in Boulogne-Billancourt.

In June 1995, de Keersmaeker received the title of Doctor Honoris Causa at the Vrije Universiteit Brussel. In March 1996, the government of the province of Antwerp awarded her the Eugène Baie prize, and in May 2000 she was awarded by the French Republic the "Officier dans l'Ordre des Arts et des Lettres" title. In 2002 she received the annual award of the Gabriella Moortgat Stichting and la médaille de Vermeil from the City of Paris and a medal ('Erepenning') of the Belgian Flemish government. In 2004, she was awarded the "Keizer Karelprijs" by the province of Oost Vlaanderen. In 2008, she became—again in France — "Commandeur de l'Ordre des Arts et des Lettres". In 2025 De Keersmaeker won the prestigious Praemium Imperiale award in the category 'Theatre/Film'.

== Honours ==
- 1996 Created Baroness de Keersmaeker, by king Albert II
- 2000 Officer in the Ordre des Arts et des Lettres of the French Republic
- 2005 Member of the Royal Flemish Academy of Belgium for Science and the Arts
- 2008 Commander in the Order of Arts and Letters
- 2012 Golden Medal of the City of Lisbon
- 2014 Medal for Merit to Culture from the Portuguese government
- 2015 Venice Biennale Golden Lion for Lifetime Achievement
- 2015: Austrian Decoration for Science and Art
- 2021 Bronze Zinneke
- 2021 Helena Vaz da Silva European Award

== Choreography ==
- 2023 EXIT ABOVE, after the tempest / d'après la tempête / naar de storm
- 2022 Forêt
- 2022 Dark Red - Beyeler/RPS
- 2022 Dark Red - Neue Nationalgalerie
- 2022 Mystery Sonatas / for Rosa
- 2021 Dark Red - Louvre-Lens
- 2020 Dark Red - Kolumba
- 2020 3ird5 @ w9rk
- 2020 The Goldberg Variations, BWV 988
- 2019 Brancusi
- 2019 The Dark Red Research Project
- 2019 Bartók / Beethoven / Schönberg
- 2019 Somnia
- 2018 The Six Brandenburg Concertos
- 2017 Zeitigung
- 2017 Mitten wir im Leben sind/Bach6cellosuiten
- 2017 A Love Supreme
- 2017 Così Fan Tutte (for the Opera of Paris)
- 2015 Die Weise Von Liebe und Tod des Cornets Christoph Rilke
- 2015 My Breathing Is My Dancing
- 2015 Work/Travail/Arbeid
- 2015 Golden Hours (As you like it)
- 2014 Verklärte Nacht
- 2014 Twice
- 2013 Vortex Temporum
- 2013 Partita 2
- 2011 Cesena
- 2010 En Atendant
- 2010 3abschied
- 2009 The Song
- 2008 Zeitung
- 2007 Keeping Still Part 1
- 2007 Steve Reich Evening
- 2006 Bartók / Beethoven / Schönberg Repertoireavond
- 2006 D'un Soir Un Jour
- 2005 Raga For The Rainy Season / A Love Supreme
- 2005 Desh
- 2004 Kassandra - Speaking In Twelve Voices
- 2003 Bitches Brew / Tacoma Narrows
- 2002 Once
- 2002 Repertoireavond
- 2002 (But If A Look Should) April Me
- 2001 Small Hands (Out Of The Lie Of No)
- 2001 Rain
- 2000 In Real Time
- 1999 I Said I
- 1999 With / For / By
- 1999 Quartett
- 1998 Drumming
- 1998 Duke Bluebeard's Castle
- 1997 Just Before
- 1997 3 Solos For Vincent Dunoyer
- 1996 Woud, Three Movements To The Music Of Berg, Schönberg & Wagner
- 1995 Erwartung / Verklärte Nacht
- 1994 Amor Constante, Más Allá De La Muerte
- 1994 Kinok
- 1993 Toccata
- 1992 Mozart / Concert Arias. Un moto di gioia.
- 1992 Erts
- 1990 Achterland
- 1990 Stella
- 1988 Ottone Ottone
- 1987 Bartók / Mikrokosmos
- 1987 Verkommenes Ufer / Medeamaterial / Landschaft mit Argonauten
- 1986 Bartók / Aantekeningen
- 1984 Elena's Aria
- 1983 Rosas danst Rosas
- 1982 Fase, Four Movements to the Music of Steve Reich
- 1980 Asch

== Choreography for other companies than Rosas ==
- The Lisbon Piece (for the Portuguese Companhia Nacional de Bailado)

== Opera directions ==
- Bluebeard's Castle (music by Bartók) (1998)
- I due Foscari (music by Verdi) (2003)
- Hanjo (music by Toshio Hosokawa) (2004)
- Così fan tutte (music by Mozart) (2017)

== Filmography ==
- Répétitions (Marie André, 1985, 43min)
- Hoppla! (Wolfgang Kolb, 1989, 52min)
- Monoloog van Fumiyo Ikeda op het einde van Ottone, Ottone (Walter Verdin, Anne Teresa De Keersmaeker and Jean-Luc Ducourt, 1989, 6min23sec)
- Ottone, Ottone (Part 1 and 2) (Walter Verdin and Anne Teresa De Keersmaeker, 1991, Part 1: 52min and Part 2: 50min)
- Rosa (Peter Greenaway, 1992, 16min)
- Mozartmateriaal (Jurgen Persijn and Ana Torfs, 1993, 52min)
- Achterland (Anne Teresa de Keersmaeker and Herman Van Eyken, 1994, 84min)
- Tippeke (Thierry De Mey, 1996, 18min)
- Rosas danst Rosas (Thierry De Mey, 1997, 57min)
- Ma mère l'Oye (Thierry De Mey, 2001, 28min)
- Fase (Thierry De Mey, 2002, 58min)
- Counter Phrases (Thierry De Mey, 2004)
- Prélude à la mer (Thierry De Mey, 2009, 16min)[
- Early Works - Films and Documentaries 4 DVDs / Cinéart, 2012 (Fase, A film by Thierry De Mey, 2002, 58 min - Rosas danst Rosas, A film by Thierry De Mey, 1997, 57 min - Répétitions, A film by Marie André, 1985, 43 min - Hoppla!, A film by Wolfgang Kolb, 1989, 52 min)
- Rain (Olivia Rochette en Gerard-Jan Claes, 2012, 83min)
- Work/Travail/Arbeid A film installation by Eric De Kuyper (2017)
- Mitten (Olivia Rochette en Gerard-Jan Claes, 2019, 53min)
