= Frank Gillette =

American artist (born 1941)

- Born: July 26, 1941 (age 84); Jersey City, NJ.
- Known for: Video art, Video installation art, Contemporary art, Raindance Corporation
- Notable work: Wipe Cycle
- Movement: Video art
- Awards: Rockefeller Foundation, Guggenheim Foundation, New York State Council on the Arts, National Endowment for the Arts, American Academy in Rome.
- Website: http://www.frankgillette.com

Frank Gillette (born in 1941) is an American video and installation artist. Interested in the empirical observation of natural phenomena, his early work integrated the viewer's image with prerecorded information. He has been described as a "pioneer in video research [...] with an almost scientific attention for taxonomies and descriptions of ecological systems and environments". His seminal work Wipe Cycle –co-produced with Ira Schneider in 1968– is considered one of the first video installations in art history. Gillette and Schneider exhibited this early "sculptural video installation" in TV as a Creative Medium, the first show in the United States devoted to Video Art. In October 1969, Frank Gillette and Michael Shamberg founded the Raindance Corporation, a "media think-tank [...] that embraced video as an alternative form of cultural communication.

== Biography ==
=== Life and education ===
Frank Gillette was born in 1941 in Jersey City, NJ. He attended Columbia University –dropping out after two years– and studied painting at Pratt Institute in New York –dropping out also after two years. He lives with the artist Suzanne Anker in Manhattan and East Hampton, NY.

=== Video Art pioneer ===
Gillette was one of the first artist to explore video as a vehicle for social and political change. Described as an "abstract painter turned media activist", Frank Gillette's fascination with Marshall McLuhan's ideas made him connect with Paul Ryan –who was McLuhan's assistant at the Center for Media Understanding at Fordham University in the Bronx. During the spring of 1968, Ryan facilitated access to four Portapack video cameras, that Gillette (and others) used to make alternative television.

=== Raindance Corporation ===
Raindance Corporation was conceived in 1969 by Frank Gillette to "promote and disseminate ideas about video as a radical alternative to centralized television broadcasting". In October 1969, Frank Gillette, Michael Shamberg, Louis Jaffe, and Marco Vassi registered Raindance as a Delaware corporation –in an ironic reference to the mainstream organization Rand Corporation. Raindance was later joined by Phyllis Gershuny and Beryl Korot, who worked producing the publication Radical Software.

=== Awards and recognition ===
Frank Gillette is the recipient of fellowships from the Rockefeller Foundation (1983) and the Guggenheim Foundation (1979), as well as grants from the New York State Council on the Arts (1970, 1972, 1974) and the National Endowment for the Arts (1976, 1980). He was artist-in-residence at the American Academy in Rome in 1984–85.

== Selected works ==
=== Keep, 1968 ===
4-channel video, black and white, 20 min each.

=== Wipe Cycle, 1969 ===
Video installation with one CCTV camera, six videotape recorders (two playback prerecorded material and four record and playback time-delay loops), nine television monitors of which one is a receiver, one audio tape deck, and one automatic switcher, 9½ x 8 x 2 ft. Built for the exhibition TV As A Creative Medium, Howard Wise Gallery, New York.

Wipe Cycle (1969) is a seminal video installation by Frank Gillette and Ira Schneider that transposes present-time demands as a way to disrupt television's one-sided flow of information. Consider an example of the "earliest uses of real-time closed-circuit video technology in an art gallery", Wipe Cycle "expanded the relation of the audience to the artwork, from passive receptors to actual participants".

In the exhibition TV as a Creative Medium (1969), this installation was constructed in front of an elevator so that each visitor was immediately confronted with his or her image. The monitors also featured two videotapes and a television program. The installation made visitors part of the information. It was programmed in a highly complicated fashion: in four cycles, images wandered from one monitor to another delayed by eight or sixteen seconds, while counter-clockwise a gray light impulse wiped out all of the other images every two seconds.

Gillette and Schneider sought to "create a experience that would break the conventional single-screen TV perspective by providing a complex mix of live images and multiple viewports".

=== The Rays, 1970 ===
Video, black and white, 20 minutes. Produced with Paul Ryan.

=== Hark! Hork!, 1972-1973 ===
Video, black and white, sound, 19:25 min.

Taking its title from a scene in James Joyce's Finnegans Wake, in which Finnegan awakens from a dream, Hark! Hork! evokes natural and subconscious landscapes.

=== Tetragramaton, 1973 ===
Video, black and white, 138 min.

Six videotape playback decks, one audio deck, 30 television monitors, 10 (h) x 20' (diameter) x 25 minutes. Six different prerecorded channels of video

information are simultaneously displayed on the monitors, with two different channels displayed on each stack of ten in the illustrated arrangement.

Taking its title from the four consonants of the ancient Hebrew name for God, Tetragramaton contemplates the relationship between man, technology, and ecological systems.

=== Muse, 1974 ===
Three-channel video, black and white, 26:00 min each.

Characteristic of much of Gillette's work—which treats video as a field of light, movement and reflection—Muse extends beyond optical sensation to engage the viewer in metaphysical contemplation.

=== Quidditas, 1974-1975 ===
Video, color, sound, 19:00 min.

Originally designed as a three-channel work, Quidditas is a study of Cape Cod's woodland and coastal landscapes.

=== Rituals for a Still Life, 1974-1975 ===
Video, black and white, sound, 24:54 min.

A stunning graphic composition of form and surface, Rituals for a Still Life links Gillette's video and collage work. Here he constructs a series of enigmatic collages that have as their background a television monitor showing his videotapes.

=== The Maui Cycle, 1976 ===
Three-channel video installation, color, sound, 45:40 min.

In this three-channel work, Gillette employs systematic formal strategies to chart the rich texture and aura of the Hawaiian landscape.

=== Mecox, 1976-77 ===
Three-channel video installation, color, sound. 18:06 min (each channel).

Rhythmically composed, Mecox is an artificial system that gracefully charts the patterns of a natural ecosystem. In this three-channel work, Gillette presents a microcosm of Mecox Bay, a salt marsh on Long Island, by reconstructing it within a contained aquarium

=== Symptomatic Syntax, 1981 ===
Video, color, sound, 27:20 min.

Symptomatic Syntax is a recreation of an ecological environment in which natural forms — leaves, flower petals, butterfly wings — form an ever-changing, visually compelling series of compositions.

=== Riverrun, 2017-2018 ===
Three-channel video installation, color, sound.

Riverrun (2017–2018) is a three-channel video installation by Frank Gillette. The work focuses on humans’ experience with the natural world positions through art historical genres. Each channel is titled individually and has a slightly different duration, creating variations in time when projected: Still Life (left, 23:29 min), Counter-Statement (center, 23:28 min), and Landscape (right, 24:00 min). This is the most recent large scale video installation by the pioneer video artist. Riverrun was premiered at the exhibition Frank Gillette: Excavations and Banquets (February 9 – April 21, 2019) at the Everson Museum of Art, Syracuse, New York, and is in its permanent collection.

== Exhibitions ==
=== Selected list of solo exhibitions ===
2024. “Frank Gillette: The Symbiotic Blues" (October 24 - December 6, 2024). Level of Service Not Required - Fine Art Gallery, La Jolla, California https://www.losnotrequired.com/gillette

2019. Frank Gillette: Excavations and Banquets (February 9 – April 21, 2019). Everson Museum of Art, Syracuse, New York

2004. Universal Concepts Unlimited, NYC

2002. Universal Concepts Unlimited, NYC

2000. Universal Concepts Unlimited, NYC

1999. Everson Museum of Art, Syracuse, NY

1999. Laumont Editions, NYC

1999. Art-Life MOCA, LA

1994. Florida State University Museum, Tallahassee

1992. B-4-A Gallery, NYC

1991. Attitude Art, NYC

1989. Catherine Turner Gallery (Special Photographer's Company), London

1987. Zenith Gallery, Washington, D.C.

1986. Loughetton Gallery, NYC

1986. Institute of Contemporary Art, Boston

1985. American Academy in Rome / London Video Arts, London

1983. Lawrence Oliver Gallery, Philadelphia

1983. Whitney Museum of American Art, NYC

1982. Leo Castelli Gallery, NYC

1982. Woodstock Arts Center, Woodstock, NY

1982. Honolulu Academy of Art, Honolulu

1981. E.C. Windward Gallery, L.A. / San Francisco Art Institute, S.F.

1980. Corcoran Gallery of Art, Washington, D.C.

1980. The Kitchen, NYC

1979. University Art Museum, Berkeley, CA

1979. Honolulu Academy of Art, Honolulu

1979. Leo Castelli Gallery, NYC

1978. Contemporary Arts Museum, Houston, TX

1978. The Kitchen, NYC

1978. Robinson Gallery, Houston, TX

1977. Leo Castelli Gallery, NYC

1977. Whitney Museum of American Art, NYC

1976. Leo Castelli Gallery, NYC

1975. Long Beach Museum of Art, CA

1975. Anthology Film Archives, NYC

1974. Art/Tapes 22, Florence, Italy

1974. The Kitchen, NYC

1974. Lowe Art Museum, Miami, FL

1973. Everson Museum of Art, Syracuse, NY

1969. Howard Wise Gallery, NYC

1964. Granite Gallery, NYC

=== Group exhibitions ===
Gillette's work has been included in numerous group shows including: Art in Motion. 100 Masterpieces with and through Media. ZKM | Center for Art and Media, Karlsruhe (2018); Radical Software. The Raindance Foundation, Media Ecology and Video Art. ZKM | Center for Art and Media, Karlsruhe (2017): The American Century Art & Culture 1900-2000 Part II, Whitney Museum of American Art, NYC (1999); TV as a Creative Medium, Whitney Museum of American Art, NYC (1994); Raindance: 20th Years, The Kitchen, NYC (1991); Video Skulptur, Kunsthaus, Zurich (1990); Video Skulptur, Kolnischer Kunstverein, Cologne (1989); American Video Landscape, Museum of Modern Art, San Francisco (1989); Video Skulptur, Neuer Berliner Kunstverein, Berlin (1989); American Landscape Video, Carnegie Museum of Art, Pittsburgh (1988); Primitivism in 20th Century Art, The Museum of Modern Art, NYC (1984); "New American Video Art: A Historical Survey, 1967-1980, Whitney Museum of American Art, NYC (1984); "La Biennale di Venezia", Venice (1982); Corcoran Gallery of Art, Washington, D.C. (1982); Musee de Beaux-Arts, Montreal (1978); "Documenta 6 ", Kassel (1977); Biennale São Paulo, Brazil (1976); San Francisco Museum of Modern Art (1976); Museum of Fine Arts, Boston (1976); Whitney Biennial, Whitney Museum of American Art, NYC (1975); The Museum of Modern Art, NYC (1974); Kunsthalle, Cologne (1975), Walker Art Center, Minneapolis (1974); Circuit, Everson Museum of Art, Syracuse, NY (1972); Air, Everson Museum of Art, Syracuse, NY (1971); Vision and Television, Rose Art Museum, Brandeis University, Boston (1970); TV As A Creative Medium, Howard Wise Gallery, NYC (1969).

== Authored Publications and Monographs ==
Between Paradigms: The Mood and Its Purpose (1973).

Frank Gillette; Video: Process and Meta-Process. (1973) Edited by Judson Rosebush. Catalog of an exhibition held at the Everson Museum of Art of Syracuse, NY.

Aransas: Axis of Observation (1978). Catalog of an exhibition held at the Contemporary Arts Museum, Houston, TX.

American Landscape Video : The Electronic Grove (1988). Catalog of an exhibition held at the Carnegie Museum of Art, Pittsburgh, PA.

Of Another Nature (1988).

Frank Gillette: Axis of Observation I (2018). Monograph edited by Suzanne Anker and Sabine Flach.
