= Guerrilla television =

Guerrilla television is a form of media activism that emerged in the United States in the late 1960s and early 1970s. Using portable video equipment, independent collectives sought to challenge commercial broadcast television by producing and distributing their own recordings, emphasizing audience participation, community access, and alternative perspectives. The term was coined in 1971 by Michael Shamberg, a co-founder of the Raindance Corporation, a countercultural video collective established in 1969.

== History of the term ==
In 1969, Michael Shamberg, Paul Ryan and others co-founded a video collective called Raindance Corporation. From 1967 to 1969, Ryan had been a close assistant to Marshall McLuhan. In 1970, McLuhan described World War III as a "guerrilla information war". Ryan's article Cybernetic Guerrilla Warfare appeared in the spring 1971 issue of Radical Software, a journal of the Raindance Corporation. Shamberg used Guerrilla Television as the title of his 1971 book.

As early as 1967, Umberto Eco used similar terminology in a lecture he gave in New York City, coining the term "semiological guerrilla" and using expressions like "communications guerrilla warfare" and "cultural guerrilla."

== Ideas ==
Guerrilla television developed as a critique of the centralized, one-way communication of commercial broadcast television. Influenced by Marshall McLuhan, Buckminster Fuller, and ideas from cybernetics and media ecology, members of the Raindance Corporation and related video collectives advocated using portable video technology to enable audiences to become active participants in media production rather than passive consumers. Their aim was not simply to introduce alternative programming into existing television networks, but to establish new structures for producing and distributing information.

An important concept within the movement was feedback. Unlike conventional broadcasting, which transmitted information from a small number of producers to a mass audience, portable video equipment allowed recordings to be played back immediately and discussed with participants. Video collectives experimented with "street tapes", interviews, and collective screenings to encourage dialogue and self-representation. For example, the People's Video Theater invited people interviewed on New York City streets to watch their recordings later that day. Such practices were intended to challenge the one-way communication model of commercial television. The Raindance journal Radical Software, first published in 1970, connected geographically dispersed video collectives and circulated technical information, recordings available for exchange, and ideas about democratic access to media.

In his 1971 book Guerrilla Television, Michael Shamberg described conventional network broadcasting as "beast-TV" and advocated nonviolent alternatives to its dominance. The book combined media theory with practical instructions for using portable recording equipment, particularly the Sony Portapak. It also discussed community video, local screenings, and alternative distribution through videocassettes and cable television. Shamberg's concept of media ecology emphasized decentralized communication and greater public control over the production and circulation of information.

These ideas informed the activities of several video collectives. The Videofreex, for example, experimented with community-based production and operated the alternative television station Lanesville TV in upstate New York. Top Value Television (TVTV), formed in 1972 by Shamberg and other independent videomakers, brought together participants from several collectives to apply portable video techniques to political journalism. Its documentaries The World's Largest TV Studio and Four More Years covered the 1972 Democratic and Republican national conventions, respectively, offering perspectives that differed from conventional network television coverage. TVTV shared personnel and ideas with Raindance but operated as a separate production collective.

== See also ==
- Lord of the Universe (documentary), won DuPont-Columbia Award, 1974
- Public access television
- Radical Software
- Vineland, a novel by Thomas Pynchon prominently featuring a guerrilla television collective
