= Three Tales (opera) =

2002 video-opera by Steve Reich

- Video-opera by Steve Reich
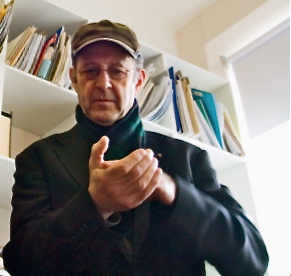
- The composer in 2008
- Language: English
- Based on: Hindenburg disaster; Bikini Atoll nuclear testings; Dolly the sheep
- Premiere: May 12, 2002; Vienna Festival

Three Tales is a video-opera in three acts (titled Hindenburg, Bikini and Dolly) with music by American composer Steve Reich and visuals by Beryl Korot, his wife. It is scored for two sopranos, three tenors, string quartet, percussion, keyboards, and pre-recorded audio. Its premiere was at the Vienna Festival on May 12, 2002 and was broadcast on IFC January 12, 2004; the BBC had commissioned a version for television broadcast four months later. The 12-minute tale Hindenburg had been written (and recorded) in 1998, while the remaining tales were completed (and recorded) in the year of the premiere.

== Summary ==
The musical narrative of Three Tales follows "speech melodies" of pre-recorded interviews, and in many ways resembles Reich's works The Cave (1990–1993), City Life (1995) and Different Trains (1988). The libretto of Three Tales can be found on the website of the composer (see bottom of page).

Three Tales is a response to nearly a hundred years of modern technology, concerning the explosion of the Hindenburg, nuclear testings on Bikini Atoll, and the cloning of Dolly the sheep (drawing connections between genetic engineering and artificial intelligence). The different stories are told from various perspectives, with speech culled from interviews with eyewitnesses, audiovisual documentary material of both the Hindenburg and Bikini tragedies, and experts in computer science (e.g. Marvin Minsky and Kevin Warwick), artificial intelligence (Rodney Brooks), Rabbi Adin Steinsaltz, and genetic engineering (Richard Dawkins and Robert Pollack).

== Synopsis ==
The three tales (acts) divide into various sub-sections:

Act I – Hindenburg

It could not have been a technical matter – Nibelung Zeppelin – A very impressive thing to see – I couldn't understand It

Act II – Bikini

In the air I – The atoll I – On the ships I – In the air II – The atoll II – On the ships II – In the air III – The atoll III - On the ships III - Coda

Act III – Dolly

Cloning - Dolly - Human body machine - Darwin - Interlude - Robots/Cyborgs/Immortality

== Performers ==
- vocal quintet: 2 sopranos, 3 tenors
- 4 percussionists: 2 vibraphones, 2 snare drums, 2 pedal bass drums, suspended cymbal, large gong
- 2 pianos
- string quartet (2 violins, viola, cello)
- pre-recorded tape or hard disk recorder

== Reception and legacy ==
Andrew McGregor wrote a positive review for BBC Music, stating that the video for the third act (“Dolly”) was the most effective and arguing that “Reich and Korot can't give you the answer [to where the human race is headed], but they frame the questions more memorably and insistently than most.” Kila Packett also gave the opera a positive review in PopMatters; she argued that the first act (“Hindenburg”) is the most musically satisfying and the third act the most thought-provoking, and interpreted the work as a “a bittersweet love letter romanticizing the tragic beauty of destruction and the inevitable folly of human achievement”, but she found Korot's work on the first act to “lack visual imagination”. Andrew Clements of The Guardian awarded Three Tales a full five stars, writing “The three movements get progressively weightier, more discursive, more visually inventive [...] this piece represents a quantum leap in complexity and technological achievement.”

K Smith wrote an unfavorable review in Gramophone, stating that Reich and Korot seem oblivious to “how the Faustian pact with technology that they decry in society has also affected their own work.” Smith argued, “In both its emotional evocations as well as its compositional process, Three Tales is highly manipulative. [...] For artists so quick to criticise others for playing God, they prove vulnerable to the same temptation themselves.”

It was nominated for the Pulitzer Prize for Music the next year.

In 2016, Clements ranked the piece as one of Reich's 10 greatest.

== Recordings ==
- Steve Reich Ensemble. Three Tales. Rec. June 2002. Judith Sherman, 2003 (audio)
- Three Tales. Dir. Nick Mangano. Perf. Steve Reich Ensemble, Synergy Vocals. Videocassette. Brooklyn Academy of Music, 2002 (visual).
