= Paul Ryan (video artist) =

American video artist

Paul Louis Ryan (1943–2013) was an American video artist and communications theorist. His video art encompassed water studies and demonstrations of what Ryan called “a yoga of relationships” or Threeing, culminating in his theoretical development of the Peircean relational circuit and Earthscore notational system.

== Biography ==
Ryan was born in 1943 in The Bronx, New York, and was raised in northern New Jersey. In 1960, he joined the Passionists, a monastic preaching order of the Catholic Church; in 1962, he earned an A.A. degree from the Passionists Monastic Seminary System. After pursuing an additional three years of independent philosophical and theological studies with the order, Ryan returned to secular life in 1965. He enrolled at New York University on a full tuition scholarship, where he studied under H.W. Janson and Walter Ong before receiving a B.A. in English in 1967.

== Work ==
He partially fulfilled his alternate service requirement as a conscientious objector during the Vietnam War by assisting Marshall McLuhan as a "McLuhan Fellow" during the media theorist's 1967–1968 term as Albert Schweitzer Professor of the Humanities at Fordham University. He completed his service requirement at Fordham during the 1968–1969 term, "exploring video as a medium in McLuhan‟s terms" with early Portapak cameras. He considered this combination of "theory and practice" to be equivalent to a Master of Fine Arts degree. In 1969, he exhibited in the seminal TV as a Creative Medium show (widely regarded as one of the birth pangs of video art) at the Howard Wise Gallery and cofounded the Raindance Foundation with Frank Gillette, Michael Shamberg and Ira Schneider. While McLuhan depicted World War III in 1970 as a "guerrilla information war," in the same year Ryan wrote "Cybernetic Guerrilla Warfare" for Raindance's Radical Software journal, anticipating the subsequent development of guerrilla television in 1971.

Shortly thereafter, Ryan founded Earthscore, an intentional community in New York's Hudson Valley inspired by Gregory Bateson's writings on cybernetic feedback and the triadic thought of Charles Sanders Peirce; this precipitated the development of the Earthscore semiotic system as initially delineated in the peremptory section of Cybernetics of the Sacred, a collection of essays published in 1974. The resultant "Threeing"—a video demonstrating "a ‘yoga’ of relationships... in which three people take turns playing three different roles; initiator, respondent and mediator"—premiered at The Kitchen in 1976. This led to Ryan's conceptual development of the relational circuit, "an original topological figure that synthesizes cybernetics and semiotics" with applications in such disparate fields as international relations and conflict resolution.

As an artist, Ryan exhibited and performed at The Kitchen, the Rose Art Museum, the Museum of Modern Art, The Cloisters, the Venice Biennial, and the Dancing Theatre in New Paltz, New York. He taught at New York University, the State University of New York at New Paltz, the Savannah College of Art and Design, and The New School, where he was an associate professor of media studies at the time of his death.

On December 18, 1995, Ryan appeared on former New Paltz faculty colleague Harold Channer's talk show Conversations with Harold Hudson Channer, on MNN.

In 2008, the Smithsonian Institution's Archives of American Art created the collection Paul Ryan papers, 1943-2008.

A longtime resident of the Upper West Side in New York City, Ryan died on December 17, 2013, at his second home in Solebury, Pennsylvania, following a long illness.

== Notable Books ==
- The Three Person Solution, Purdue University Press, 2009
- Video Mind, Earth Mind: Art, Communications, and Ecology, Peter Lang, 1993
- Cybernetics of the Sacred, Doubleday Anchor, 1974
