= Different Trains =

1988 composition by Steve Reich

- by Steve Reich
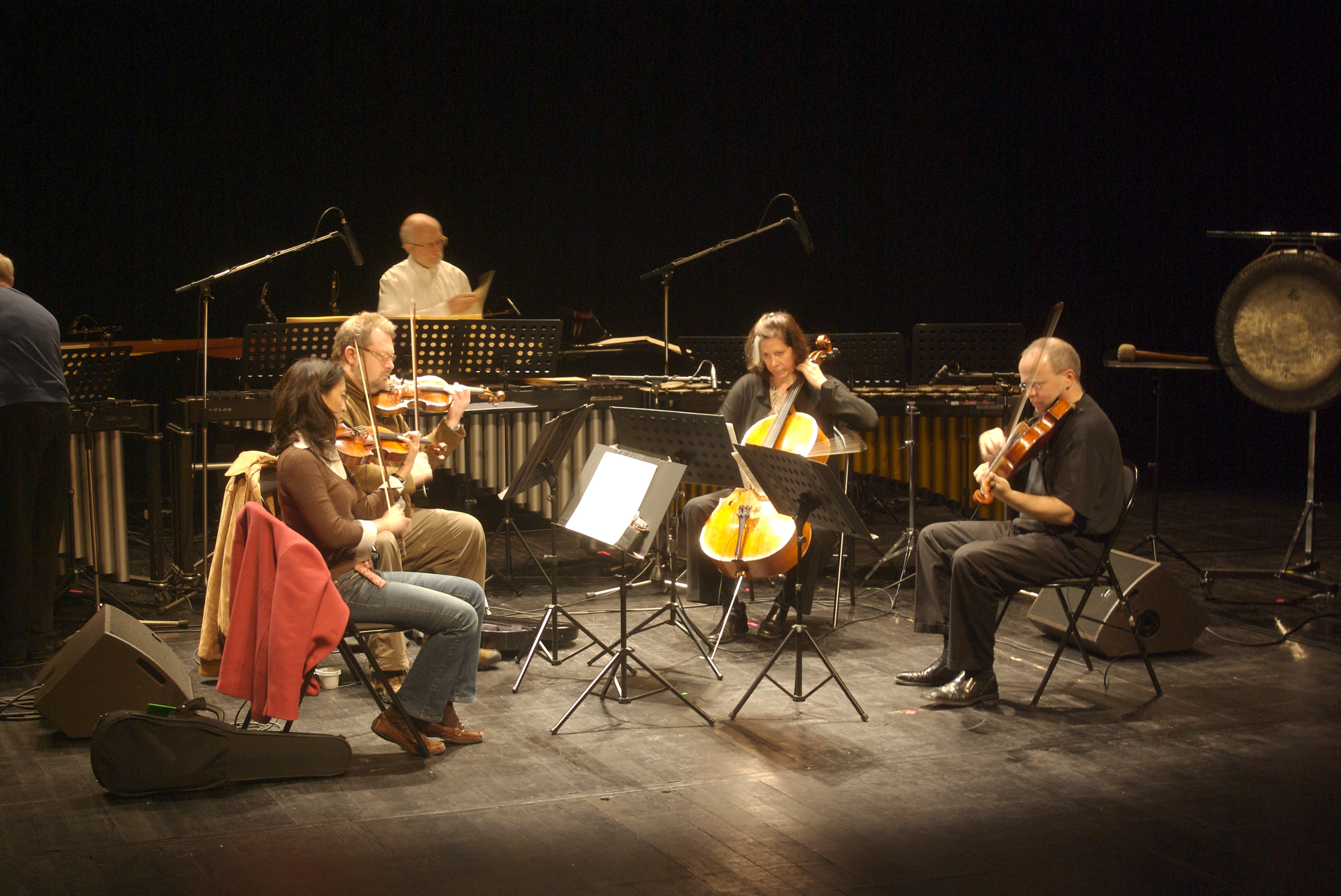
- The Steve Reich Ensemble playing Different Trains. From left to right, Liz Lim-Dutton (violin) Todd Reynolds (violin), Jeanne LeBlanc (cello), Scott Rawls (viola)
- Genre: Contemporary classical music
- Language: English
- Composed: 1988
- Duration: 27:00
- Movements: Three
- Scoring: String quartet and tape

Premiere
- Date: 1988
- Location: New Music America festival, Miami
- Performers: Kronos Quartet

Different Trains is a three-movement piece for string quartet and tape written by Steve Reich in 1988.

== Background ==
During World War II, Reich made train journeys between New York and Los Angeles to visit his parents, who had separated. Years later, he pondered the fact that, as a Jew, had he been in Europe instead of the United States at that time, he might have been traveling in Holocaust trains.

Steve Reich's earlier work had frequently used tape, looped and played back at different speeds. However, Different Trains was a novel experiment, using recorded speech as a source for melodies.

== Structure ==
Different Trains is made up of three movements, which bear the following titles:

1. America – Before the War
2. Europe – During the War
3. After the War

In each part, melodies are introduced, usually by a single instrument (viola for women and cello for men), a recording of the spoken phrase from which the melody derives is played. The melody is then developed for a while, with the instruments playing along with the recording of the phrase or part of the phrase. The music for the strings makes extensive use of paradiddle rhythms, with alternating pitches instead of alternating drum sticking. In addition to speech, the piece includes recordings of train sounds, as well as of sirens and warning bells, and prerecorded multiple lines by the string quartet, thus effectively creating four quartets out of one, reflective of three Counterpoint pieces that preceded it: Vermont Counterpoint for multiple multitracked flutes, New York Counterpoint for multiple multitracked clarinets, and Electric Counterpoint for multiple multitracked electric guitars.

The recorded version on this album lasts for approximately 27 minutes.

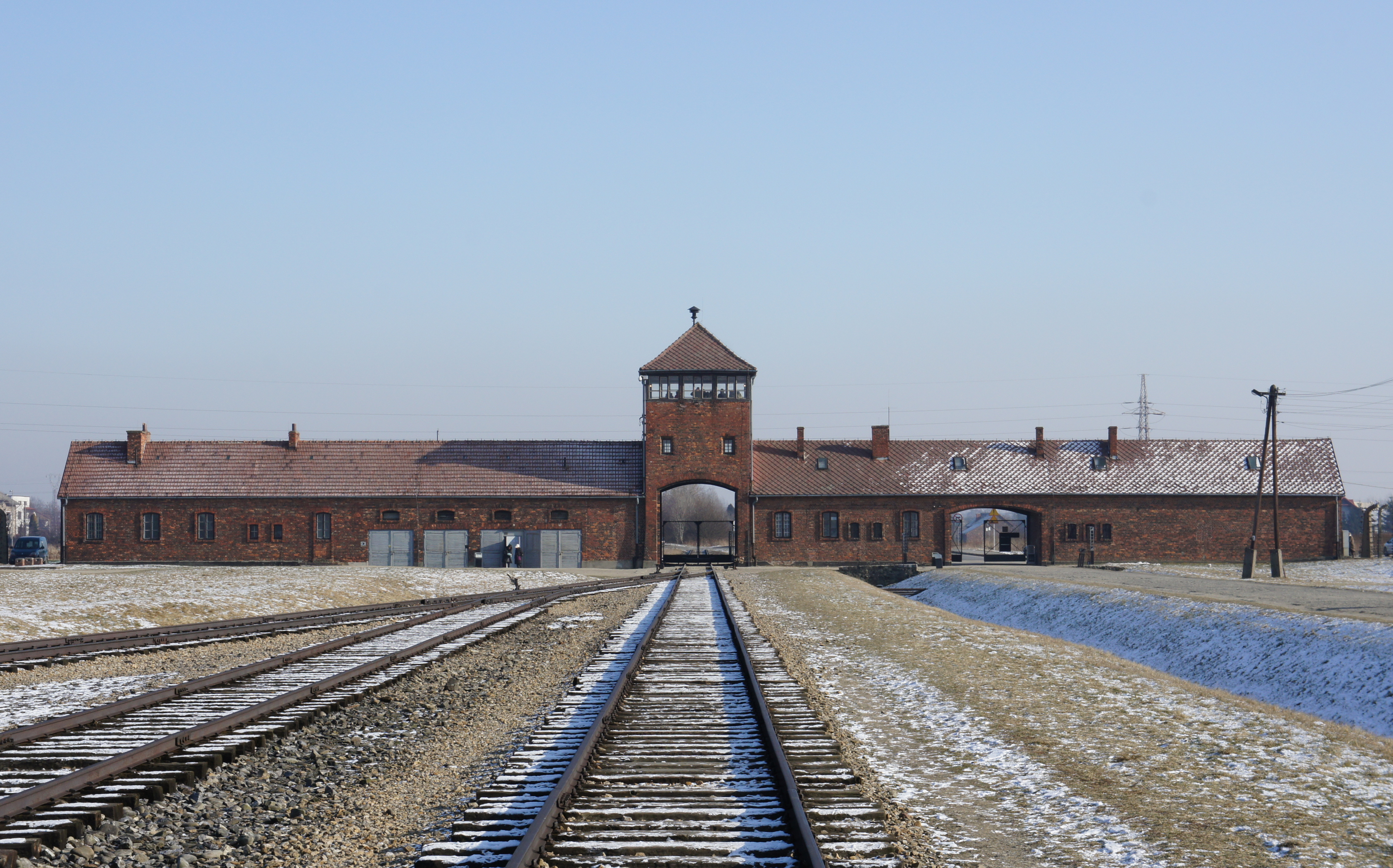
Entrance to the Auschwitz concentration camp

The recorded speech that forms the basis for Different Trains is taken from interviews with people in the United States and Europe about the years leading up to, during, and immediately after World War II. In the first movement, America — Before the War, Reich's governess Virginia and Lawrence Davis, a Pullman porter, reminisce about train travel in the U.S. while American train sounds are heard in the background. In the second movement, Europe — During the War, three Holocaust survivors (identified by Reich as Paul, Rachel, and Rachella) speak about their experiences in Europe during the war, including their train trips to concentration camps. European train sounds and sirens are heard in this movement. The American train whistles are long perfect intervals of ninths and fifths, while the European train whistles are mostly short triadic shrieks. The third movement, After the War, features the Holocaust survivors talking about the years immediately following World War II, along with recordings of Davis and Virginia. There is a return to the American train sounds from the first movement.

Reich developed his "speech melody" work further with projects such as The Cave (1993) and City Life (1995). The technique also appears in WTC 9/11 (2011), a similar work dealing with human tragedy juxtaposed with everyday life and responses to it.

Reich created these works by transferring his speech recordings into a digital sampling keyboard (a Casio FZ-1). City Life used sampling keyboards in performance (rather than using a backing tape) and the samples are notated and played in exactly the same way as the conventional instruments.

== Reception ==
The world premiere was performed by the Kronos Quartet at the First Presbyterian Church in Miami, during the 1988 New Music America festival.

Its original recording, also performed by the Kronos Quartet, won the Grammy Award for Best Classical Contemporary Composition in 1989.
