= Earthscore =

Notational system

Earthscore is a notational system that enables collaborating videographers to produce a shared perception of environmental realities. The system optimizes the use of video and television in the context of the environmental movement by incorporating the cybernetic ideas of Gregory Bateson and the semiotics of Charles Sanders Peirce. The intent of the system is to generate human behaviors that comply with the self-correcting mechanisms of the Earth. Earthscore has been studied and utilized by university students and academics worldwide since 1992.

Earthscore was developed and created by The New School professor and artist Paul Ryan, and originally published by NASA in 1990.

== Components ==
In its most complete and succinct iteration, Earthscore is a notational system with five components. These components are:

- Three Comprehensive Categories of Knowledge: The categories of firstness, secondness, and thirdness
- The Relational Circuit: A circuit that organizes the categories of firstness, secondness, and thirdness in unambiguous, relative positions
- Threeing: A formal, teachable version of cooperation
- The Firstness of Thirdness: A spontaneous, intuitive appreciation of a pattern in nature
- The Semiotic System for Interpretation: A process of generating signs to approach knowledge

=== Three Comprehensive Categories of Knowledge ===
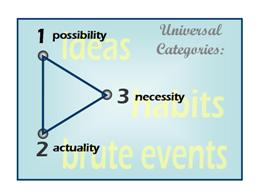
The Three Peircean Categories

Using the trikonic categories of firstness, secondness, and thirdness developed by American philosopher Charles Sanders Peirce, Earthscore splits knowledge into three modes of being: firstness (positive quality), secondness (fact), and thirdness (laws that will govern facts in the future), and defines these categories as "a theory of everything".

Firstness is positive quality in the realm of spontaneity, freshness, possibility, and freedom. Earthscore defines firstness as being "as is", without regard for any other. Examples include: the taste of banana, warmth, redness, and feeling gloomy.

Secondness is a two-sided consciousness of effort and resistance engendered by being up against brute facts. Earthscore defines secondness as the "facticity", or "thisness", of something, as it exists, here and now, without rhyme or reason. Examples include: pushing against a locked door and meeting silent, unseen resistance.

Thirdness mediates between secondness and firstness, between fact and possibility. Earthscore defines thirdness as the realm of habit and laws that will govern facts in the future, and posits that a knowledge of thirdness can allow predictions of how certain future events will turn out. It is an 'if...then' sort of knowledge. Thirdness consists in the reality that future facts of secondness will conform to general laws.

=== The Relational Circuit ===
The relational circuit is a self-penetrating, tubular continuum with six unambiguous positions which attempts to supply a topological continuum to the trikonic categories. The circuit organizes differences in terms of firstness, secondness, and thirdness, and three "in-between" positions that connect them within the continuum. The relational circuit is to the Earthscore System what the staff and bars are to classical music notation, and is the basis of the third component, threeing.

=== Threeing ===
Threeing is a practice in which three people take turns playing three different roles. Initiator, respondent and mediator, in an attempt to solve relational confusion. The roles correspond to the categories of firstness, secondness, and thirdness. Through role playing, the three individuals interact with each other spontaneously and recursively, following the relational circuit.

Threeing is further broken down into ten different subsections:

- Profiling Skills and the Talking Stick
- Diagnosing Relational Problems
- Dividing the Tasks
- Making Decisions
- Reading Charles Peirce
- Imitating Sherlock Holmes
- Cultivating Creativity
- Solving Problems
- Planning to Three
- Exploring the Yoga of Threeing

=== The Firstness of Thirdness ===
Earthscore utilizes the Firstness of Thirdness as a means of creativity, in an attempt to imagine an ecologically sustainable life before living it. By incorporating pure firstness as the realm of spontaneity, Earthscore uses the disciplines of Zen, yoga, and tai chi to cultivate the human capacity to be comfortable in pure firstness and yield new insights and visions.

=== The Semiotic System for Interpretation ===
Earthscore approaches knowledge as a process of generating signs, and incorporates the semiotic system of Charles Sanders Peirce consistent with the trikonic categories: A sign (firstness) representing an object (secondness) for an interpretant (thirdness). Earthscore exfoliates the threefold division into a sixty-six-fold classification of signs that is inclusive of everything in nature, in order to systematize both interdisciplinary and multimedia representations of ecosystems.

== See also ==
- Communication studies
- Cultural studies
- Critical theory
- Cybernetics
- Encodings
- Information theory
- International Association for Semiotic Studies
- Linguistics
- Logic
- Meaning
- Media studies
- Semiotic elements and classes of signs (Peirce)
- Semiotic information theory
- Semiotic Society of America
