= The Standby Program =

American non-profit video post-production organization

The Standby Program is a non-profit, video post-production service organization in New York City. Since 1983, Standby has provided editorial services to independent film and video producers on a wide range of projects, including documentaries, video art, installations, sound mixes, film-to-tape transfers and video preservation.

== History ==
Alex Roshuk and Rick Feist, film students at Princeton University, started the program at Matrix, a large video studio on Eleventh Avenue and West 52nd Street. Feist began working there as a tape operator and suggested to the owners that they offer online editing to artists on the weekends and late at night at reduced rates on a standby basis (hence the name). Matrix had three large video studios with blue screen, three online video suites, a tape library and production office space. (Today it is home to Comedy Central's The Daily Show.)

Roshuk's 185 Corporation became the non-profit umbrella for Standby. The program became a model in the 1980s for the way artists could interface with corporations for effective use of technical and financial resources. Artists' using Standby paid upfront, which benefited two-fold. Such an arrangement ensured Matrix that they would be paid on time and that all the projects edited were vetted as bonafide, independent productions.

Juan Downey's Information Withheld was the first artist project to be edited at Standby. Downey began a long relationship with Feist and edited all his tapes from The Thinking Eye project there, as well as one of the first interactive art videos, BachDisk. In less than a year, demand for the program began to outpace its resources. It attracted interest from other artists, including Dara Birnbaum, Nam June Paik, Mary Lucier, Gary Hill, Gretchen Bender, Edin Velez, and Jem Cohen, among others.

Standby rapidly grew, adding new editors, tape operators, and administrators. Matrix donated the second floor of the tape library to house all the artists' master tapes. Standby started to receive funding as a media arts center from the New York State Council for the Arts, the National Endowment for the Arts, New York City Department of Cultural Affairs, the Andy Warhol Foundation, and the MacArthur Foundation. By the end of the 1980s, the staff of the Standby program included Tom Crawford, Joe DePierro, Rick Feist, Nora Fisch, Eleanor Goldsmith, Lisa Guido, Steve Guiliano, and Kathy High. The Raindance Foundation served as its umbrella organization.

With the closing of Matrix in 1990, Standby relocated to a number of other post-production facilities, primarily working out of Editel NY, until that facility closed in 1995. Maria Venuto became executive director that same year, and integrated the operation of Media Alliance's Online Program, a similar post-production service that also started in 1983 with Standby's help. Under the leadership of Executive Director Maria Venuto, Standby's services have expanded to include a magnetic media preservation program.
