= Dean Evenson =

American composer and performer

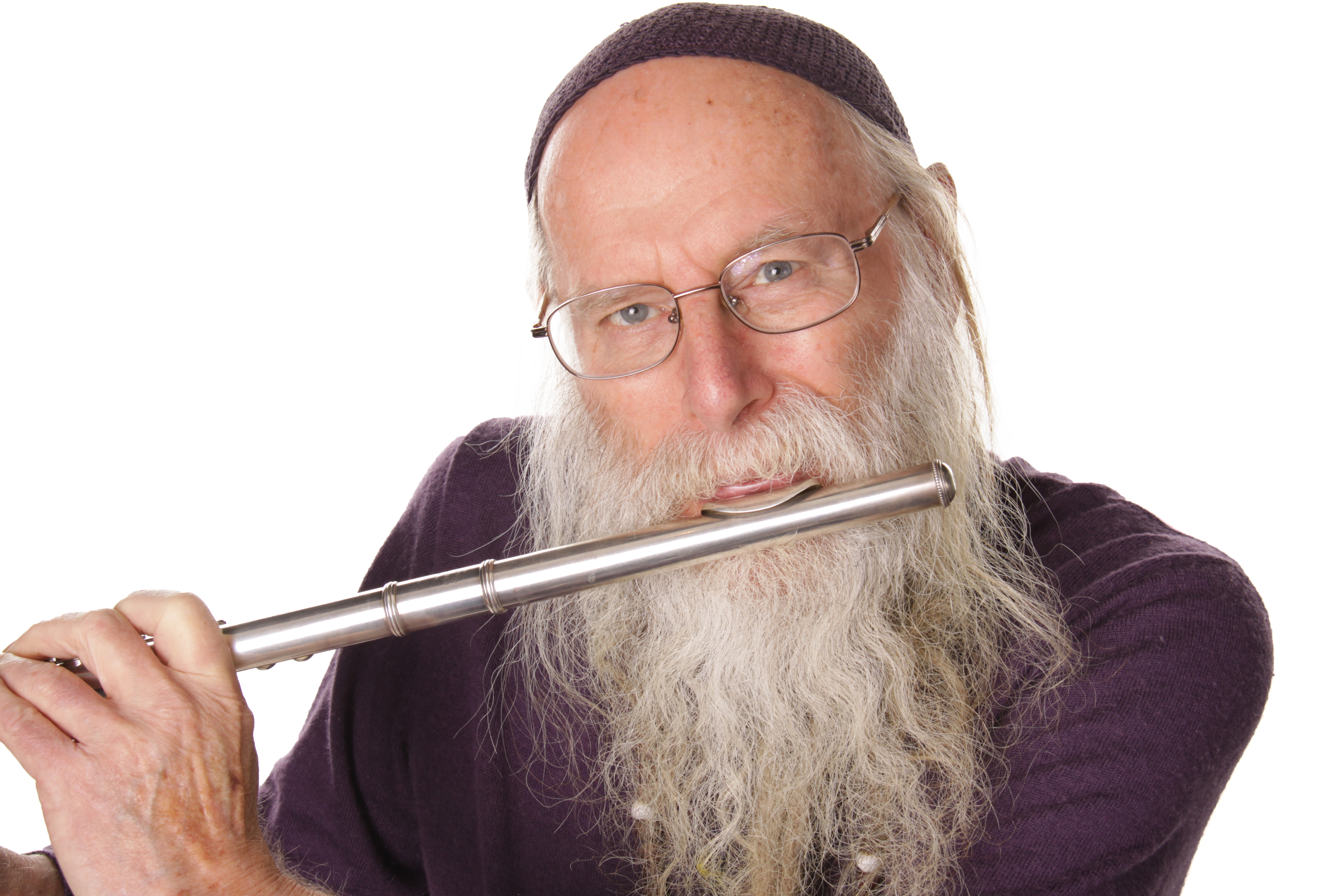
- Dean Evenson playing his Haynes silver flute

Background information
- Born: December 14, 1944 (age 81); Staten, New York, US
- Genres: New-age; instrumental; world
- Occupations: Musician, composer, producer, flutist, and videographer
- Instruments: Native American flute; keyboards; synthesizer
- Years active: 1982–present
- Label: Soundings of the Planet
- Spouse: Dudley Evenson (1970–present)
- Website: soundings.com/pages/dean-evenson

Dean Evenson (born December 14, 1944) is an American new-age musician, composer, producer, flutist, and videographer. Dean plays several instruments including the Western concert flute, Native American flute, synthesizer, and keyboard. His music generally features sounds of nature combined with flute melodies and other instruments for ambience, massage, meditation, yoga and relaxation.

== Work and collaboration ==
In addition to recording with his harpist wife Dudley Evenson, he has collaborated with many artists from around the world, including Li Xiangting, Chinese master of the guqin (7-string zither), Sergey Kuryokhin, Russian avant-garde composer, Native American elder Cha-das-ska-dum, Native flutist Peter Ali, Senegalese kora player Youssoupha Sidibe, and even the Dalai Lama of Tibet. He has also collaborated with Hungarian pianist Tom Barabas, trance guitarist Scott Huckabay, harpist d'Rachael, violist Phil Heaven, and Tim Alexander, innovative drummer from the rock group Primus. In 1969, Evenson played flute for the psychedelic rock group The Blues Magoos on their album Never Goin' Back to Georgia.

He worked in Manhattan as a recording engineer for Regent Sound with many Atlantic recording artists, including Eric Clapton, Mose Allison, and Roberta Flack.

In 1970, he and his wife Dudley Evenson became involved in the portable-video movement. They worked under grants from the New York State Council on the Arts with Raindance Foundation, at the Metropolitan Museum of Art, and helped publish a magazine called Radical Software. During the 1970s, the Evensons traveled the country in a half-sized converted school bus, documenting the emerging new-age consciousness. They produced hundreds of hours of half-inch black-and-white video which can be seen on their Soundings Mindful Media YouTube channel.

His music has also been included in Kate and Leopold, the PBS series "The Way West" and the preview for "The Jungle Book"

== Personal life ==
He was born in Staten Island, New York, the United States.

Evenson earned his master's degree in Molecular Biology in 1968 from the University of Maine. The same year he met his future wife Dudley. He and Dudley currently live in the Pacific Northwest by a wild river in the foothills of the Cascade Mountains. They have three children and one granddaughter.

In 1979, Dean and Dudley Evenson founded the independent record company Soundings of the Planet in Tucson, Arizona.

In 1977, Evenson first performed with the American singer-songwriter and environmentalist John Denver on the Pine Ridge Reservation in South Dakota. Later he performed with Denver at the Earth Summit in Rio de Janeiro.

== Partial discography, DVDs, and books ==
- Soundings Tapestry – 1986 (Soundings Ensemble compilation)
- Joy to the World – 1986 (with d'Rachael)
- Peaceful Pond – 1986 (with d'Rachael)
- Soaring – 1987 (with Tom Barabas)
- Echoes of the Night – 1987 (with Tsonakwa)
- Music Makes the Snow Melt Down – 1988 (with Soviet musicians)
- What Child Is This – 1988 (with Singh Kaur, d'Rachael)
- Ocean Dreams – 1989
- Instruments of Peace – 1989 (with Singh Kaur, Tom Barabas, Don Reeve)
- Desert Moon Song – 1991 (with Dudley Evenson)
- Wind Dancer – 1992 (with Tom Barabas)
- Forest Rain – 1994
- Ascension – 1995 (with Dudley Evenson)
- Dreamstreams – 1996
- Arctic Refuge: A Gathering of Tribes – 1996 (with Native American musicians)
- Reflections: Gentle Music for Loving – 1996 (Soundings Ensemble compilation)
- Back to the Garden – 1997 (with Tom Barabas)
- Prayer: A Multi-cultural Journey of Spirit – 1998 (Various artists compilation)
- Sound Healing – 1998 (Soundings Ensemble compilation)
- Healing Waters – 1999
- Peace Through Music 20th Anniversary Sampler – 1999 (Soundings Ensemble compilation)
- Tao of Healing – 2000 (with Li Xiangting)
- Sonic Tribe – 2000 (with Scott Huckabay, Gina Sala)
- Butterfly – 2000 (with Tom Barabas) (compilation)
- Native Healing – 2001 (with Cha-das-ska-dum)
- Music for the Healing Arts – 2001 (Soundings Ensemble compilation)
- Healing Dreams – 2001 (with Scott Huckabay)
- Ascension to Tibet – 2001 (with Dudley Evenson)
- Angel's Calling – 2001 (with Tom Barabas) (compilation)
- Healing Sanctuary – 2002
- Sound Massage – 2002 (Soundings Ensemble compilation)
- Tao of Peace – 2002 (with Li Xiangting)
- Spirit Rising (Sonic Tribe) – 2002 (with Scott Huckabay, Gina Sala, Beth Quist)
- Sound Yoga – 2003 (Soundings Ensemble compilation)
- Mountain Meadow Meditation – 2003 (with Scott Huckabay)
- A Gift For Mother – 2003 (with Tom Barabas)
- Raga Cycle – 2004 (with 'Pandit Shivnath Mishra, Deobrat Mishra)
- Sacred World Chants – 2004 (Various artists compilation)
- Eagle River – 2005
- Eagle River (DVD) – 2006
- Spa Rhythms – 2006 (with SoulFood)
- Golden Spa Tones – 2006 (with Walter Makichen)
- Spa Dreams – 2007 (with d'Rachael)
- Wood Over Water − 2007
- Healing The Holy Land – 2007 (Various artists compilation)
- Soundings Global Rhythms Collection – 2008 (Soundings Ensemble compilation)
- Chakra Healing – 2008 (with Soundings Ensemble)
- Meditation Moment: 52 Weekly Affirmations – 2008 (with Dudley Evenson)
- Healing Suite – 2009 (with Tom Barabas)
- Meditation Moods – 2010 (with Dudley Evenson)
- Meditation Moods DVD – 2010 (with Dudley Evenson)
- Sacred Earth – 2010
- Reiki Om – 2011 (with Henry Han)
- A Sound Sleep: Guided Meditations With Relaxing Music & Nature Sounds – 2011 (with Dudley Evenson)
- A Year of Guided Meditations (DVD) – 2012 (with Dudley Evenson)
- 2 U.N. Earth Summits (1972 & 1992) (DVD) – 2012 (with Dudley Evenson)
- Relaxation Zone – 2012
- 4 Earth: Natural Sounds of Ocean, Stream, River, Pond – 2013
- 4 Earth: Scenic Vistas of Ocean, Stream, River, Pond (DVD) – 2013
- Dream Space – 2013
- Chakra Meditations & Tones – 2014 (with Dudley Evenson, Beth Quist)
- Harmonic Way – 2014 (with Scott Huckabay)
- Sonic Healing Meet the Masters Video Course (DVD) – 2015 (with Dudley Evenson)
- Desert Dawn Song – 2015 (original 1979 cassette) (with Dudley Evenson)
- Golden Spiral – 2016 (with Scott Huckabay)
- Stillness – 2016
- Amber Sky – 2017 (with Phil Heaven & Jeff Willson)
- Quieting the Monkey Mind: How to Meditate with Music (BOOK) – 2018 (with Dudley Evenson)
- Prayers on the Wind: Native American & Silver Flutes – 2018 (with Peter Ali)
- Net of Indra – 2018 (with Tim Alexander)
- Peace Through Music 40th Anniversary Collection – 2019 (with Soundings Ensemble)
- Tropical Relaxation – 2019 (with d'Rachael)
- Healing Resonance – 2020 (with Scott Huckabay, Phil Heaven)
- Yoga Mantra – 2020 (with Deobrat Mishra)
- Monet's Garden – 2020 (with Dudley Evenson)
- Earth Within – 2022 (with Phil Heaven & Douglas Johnson)
- Seeds of Peace – 2023 (with Volodymyr Solianyk)
- Celestial Meditation – 2024
- Sacred Canyons – 2025 (Scott Huckabay & Phil Heaven)
- On Wings of Spirit – 2026 (with Peter Ali & Scott Huckabay)
- Temple of Sound – 2026 (with Youssoupha Sidibe)

== See also ==
- List of ambient music artists
