= Soundings of the Planet =

Independent media company based in Bellingham, Washington

- Founded: 1979
- Founder: Dean Evenson and Dudley Evenson
- Genre: New Age, Sound Healing
- Country of origin: United States of America
- Location: Bellingham, Washington
- Official website: http://www.soundings.com

Soundings of the Planet is an American, artist-owned, independent media company based in Bellingham, Washington that produces relaxation and world music by New Age artists and international musicians as well as documentaries on various environmental and human rights issues.

== History ==
During the 1970s, while traveling across the U.S. in their school bus home, Dean Evenson and Dudley Evenson began videotaping interviews with spiritual leaders and recording nature sounds. They formally co-founded the Soundings of the Planet record label in 1979 in Tucson, Arizona. Since then, they have produced over 80 music albums and videos.

== Musicians ==
- Dean Evenson
- Dudley Evenson
- Tom Barabas
- Scott Huckabay
- Li Xiangting
- d'Rachael
- Cha-das-ska-dum
- Pandit Shivnath Mishra
- Deobrat Mishra
- Singh Kaur (Lorellei)
- Fumio
- Walter Makichen
- Daniel Paul
- Phil Heaven
- Jeff Willson
- Peter Ali
- Tim Alexander
- Burke Mulvany

== Discography, DVDs, Book ==
- Soundings Tapestry - 1986 (Dean Evenson, Soundings Ensemble)
- Joy to the World – 1986 (Dean Evenson, d’Rachael)
- Peaceful Pond – 1986 (Dean Evenson, d’Rachael)
- Soaring - 1987 (Dean Evenson, Tom Barabas)
- Echoes the Night - 1987 (Dean Evenson, Tsonakwa)
- Music Makes the Snow Melt Down - 1988 (Dean Evenson, Soviet musicians)
- What Child Is This – 1988 (Dean Evenson, Singh Kaur, d'Rachael)
- Ocean Dreams – 1989 (Dean Evenson)
- Sedona Suite – 1992 (Tom Barabas)
- Instruments of Peace – 1989 (Dean Evenson, Singh Kaur, Tom Barabas)
- Desert Moon Song – 1991 (Dean Evenson, Dudley Evenson)
- Wind Dancer – 1992 (Dean Evenson, Tom Barabas)
- Forest Rain – 1994 (Dean Evenson)
- Classica Nouveau – 1994 (Tom Barabas)
- Piano Impressions – 1994 (Tom Barabas)
- Coastlines – 1994 (d’Rachael, Ron Doering)
- Ascension – 1995 (Dean Evenson)
- Meditation – 1995 (Fumio)
- Nature – 1995 (Fumio)
- Spiritus – 1995 (Lorellei-Singh Kaur)
- Mosaic – 1995 (Tom Barabas)
- Gypsy Sun Gypsy Moon – 1995 (Sunyata)
- Malkuri – 1995 (Malkuri)
- Dreamstreams – 1996 (Dean Evenson)
- Rhythms of Paradise – 1996 (Daniel Paul)
- Arctic Refuge: A Gathering of Tribes - 1996 (Dean Evenson, Native American artists)
- Journey Back to Sedona – 1996 (Tom Barabas)
- Reflections: Gentle Music for Loving - 1996 (Dean Evenson, Soundings Ensemble)
- Peace Dance – 1997 (Scott Huckabay)
- Back to the Garden – 1997 (Dean Evenson, Tom Barabas)
- Prayer: A Multi-cultural Journey of Spirit - 1998 (Dean Evenson, Various artists)
- It’s a New Life – 1998 (Tom Barabas)
- Sound Healing - 1998 (Dean Evenson, Soundings Ensemble)
- Romantic Rhapsodies – 1998 (Tom Barabas)
- Magic in December – 1998 (Tom Barabas)
- Alchemy – 1999 (Scott Huckabay)
- Healing Waters – 1999 (Dean Evenson)
- Peace Through Music 20th Anniversary Sampler - 1999 (Dean Evenson, Soundings Ensemble)
- Tom Barabas Live! – 1999 (Tom Barabas)
- Tao of Healing – 2000 (Dean Evenson, Li Xiangting)
- Classical Healing – 2000 (Tom Barabas)
- Shapeshifters – 2000 (Shapeshifters)
- Sonic Tribe - 2000 (Dean Evenson, Scott Huckabay, Gina Sala)
- Native Healing – 2001 (Dean Evenson, Cha-das-ska-dum)
- Music for the Healing Arts – 2001 (Dean Evenson, Soundings Ensemble)
- Healing Dreams - 2001 (Dean Evenson, Scott Huckabay)
- Ascension to Tibet - 2001 (Dean Evenson)
- Healing Sanctuary – 2002 (Dean Evenson)
- Sound Massage – 2002 (Dean Evenson, Soundings Ensemble)
- Tao of Peace – 2002 (Dean Evenson, LI Xiangting)
- Spirit Rising (Sonic Tribe) - 2002 (Dean Evenson, Scott Huckabay, Gina Sala, Beth Quist)
- Sound Yoga – 2003 (Dean Evenson, Soundings Ensemble)
- Mountain Meadow Meditation – 2003 (Dean Evenson, Scott Huckabay)
- A Gift For Mother – 2003 (Dean Evenson, Tom Barabas)
- Raga Cycle – 2004 (Dean Evenson, 'Pandit Shivnath Mishra, Deobrat Mishra)
- Sacred World Chants – 2004 (Dean Evenson, Various artists)
- Imagine Peace – 2004 (Dean Evenson, Singh Kaur, Tom Barabas)
- Eagle River – 2005 (Dean Evenson)
- Eagle River (DVD) – 2006 (Dean Evenson)
- Spa Rhythms – 2006 (Dean Evenson, SoulFood)
- Between Two Worlds – 2005 (Daniel Paul)
- Golden Spa Tones -2006 (Dean Evenson, Walter Makichen)
- Spa Dreams – 2007 (Dean Evenson, d’Rachael)
- Wood Over Water – 2007 (Dean Evenson)
- Healing the Holy Land – 2007 (Dean Evenson, Various artists)
- Soundings Global Rhythms Collection - 2008 (Dean Evenson, Soundings Ensemble)
- Chakra Healing – 2008 (Dean Evenson, Soundings Ensemble)
- Meditation Moment: 52 Weekly Affirmations - 2008 (Dudley Evenson, Dean Evenson)
- Healing Suite – 2009 (Dean Evenson, Tom Barabas)
- Meditation Moods - 2010 (Dean Evenson, Dudley Evenson)
- Meditation Moods DVD - 2010 (Dean Evenson, Dudley Evenson)
- Sacred Earth – 2010 (Dean Evenson)
- Reiki Om – 2011 (Dean Evenson, Henry Han)
- A Sound Sleep: Guided Meditations With Relaxing Music & Nature Sounds – 2011 (Dudley Evenson, Dean Evenson)
- A Year of Guided Meditations (DVD) - 2012 (Dudley Evenson, Dean Evenson,)
- 2 U.N. Earth Summits (1972 & 1992) (DVD) - 2012 (Dean Evenson, Dudley Evenson)
- Relaxation Zone –2012 (Dean Evenson)
- 4 Earth: Natural Sounds of Ocean, Stream, River, Pond – 2013 (Dean Evenson)
- 4 Earth: Scenic Vistas of Ocean, Stream, River, Pond (DVD) – 2013 (Dean Evenson, Dudley Evenson)
- Dream Space – 2013 (Dean Evenson)
- Chakra Meditations & Tones - 2014 (Dudley Evenson, Dean Evenson, Beth Quist)
- Harmonic Way - 2014 (Dean Evenson, Scott Huckabay)
- Sonic Healing Meet the Masters Video Course (DVD) - 2015 (Dean Evenson, Dudley Evenson)
- Desert Dawn Song - 2015 (original 1979 cassette) (Dean Evenson, Dudley Evenson)
- Golden Spiral - 2016 (Dean Evenson, Scott Huckabay)
- Stillness – 2016 (Dean Evenson)
- Amber Sky – 2017 (Dean Evenson, Phil Heaven & Jeff Willson)
- Quieting the Monkey Mind: How to Meditate with Music (BOOK) – 2018 (Dean Evenson, Dudley Evenson)
- Prayers on the Wind: Native American & Silver Flutes – 2018 (Dean Evenson, Peter Ali)
- Net of Indra – 2018 (Dean Evenson, Tim Alexander)
- Peace Through Music 40th Anniversary Collection – 2019 (Dean Evenson, Soundings Ensemble)
- Tropical Relaxation – 2019 (Dean Evenson, d'Rachael)
