= Tom Barabas =

American-Hungarian musical artist (died 2020)

- Born: 1934; Hungary
- Origin: Hungary
- Died: 2020 (aged 85–86) San Diego, California
- Genres: New-age; instrumental; contemporary classical
- Occupations: Pianist and keyboardist
- Instruments: Piano; keyboards
- Years active: 1971–2020
- Label: Soundings of the Planet
- Website: soundings.com/pages/tom-barabas

Tom Barabas was an American-Hungarian pianist and keyboardist. He studied classical music at the Caracas Conservatory in Venezuela before developing a taste for rock, jazz, and new age music. He died in San Diego, California in the spring of 2020 at the age of 85 or 86.

== Early life ==
Barabas was born in 1934 in Hungary, where he spent his childhood. He began playing music at the age of four in Budapest. By age 12, he had attracted the interest and praise of his piano instructors and he made his public debut at the Liszt Conservatory of Music.

In 1949 his family emigrated to Venezuela where he studied classical piano and composition at the Venezuela Conservatory of Music in Caracas, earning his master's degree in 1957. In 1966, Barabas emigrated to the US, living and composing in San Diego, California.

== Live performance ==
Barabas's compositional style was distinguished by the influences of his classical Conservatory training, the Latin and Caribbean pop music of Venezuela and North American rock and roll.

After a successful career performing daily on stage, radio and television in Venezuela, Barabas moved to San Diego in 1966 seeking greater opportunities. The Southern California music scene inspired and cultivated his interest in jazz and soon he was opening for figures such as Oscar Peterson, Bill Evans and Ramsey Lewis. He later became the house pianist for a five-star resort, and it was during his tenure there that he began playing his own compositions.

== Commercial success ==
Barabas released 12 CD's, three of which made the Billboard Charts. Sedona Suite charted number 12 and held that position for 29 weeks. Other albums of note include Wind Dancer (with Dean Evenson), reaching Billboard's Top-15, and Classica Nouveau, which reached number 18 on Billboard's Top-20.

Barabas and Dean Evenson enjoyed a long friendship and collaborated on several Soundings albums including Soaring, WindDancer, Back to the Garden and Healing Suite.

Barabas wrote and performed an original composition for the Heartkeys AIDS Benefit Concert and the Heartkeys album, and performed for the American Cancer Society and the AIDS Foundation of America. Some of his better known performance venues were the Metropolitan Museum of Art, Red Rocks Amphitheater, Delta Air Lines and Princess Cruise Lines.

== Discography ==
Studio albums

- Magic in December (1988)
- Sedona Suite (1992)
- Piano Impressions (1994)
- Classica Nouveau (1994)
- Mosaic (1995)
- Journey Back to Sedona (1996)
- It's a New Life (1998)
- Romantic Rhapsodies (1998)
- Tom Barabas Live (1999)
- Wedding in Heaven (1999) (compilation)
- Classical Healing (2000)
- Goodnight My Angel (2001) (compilation)
- The Very Best of (2004) (compilation)
- Christmas Classics On Piano (2015) (compilation)

Tom Barabas and Dean Evenson

- Wind Dancer (1992)
- Soaring (1996)
- Back to the Garden (1997)
- Butterfly (2000) (compilation)
- Angel's Calling (2001) (compilation)
- A Gift for Mother (2003)
- Healing Suite (2009)
