= Kathy High =

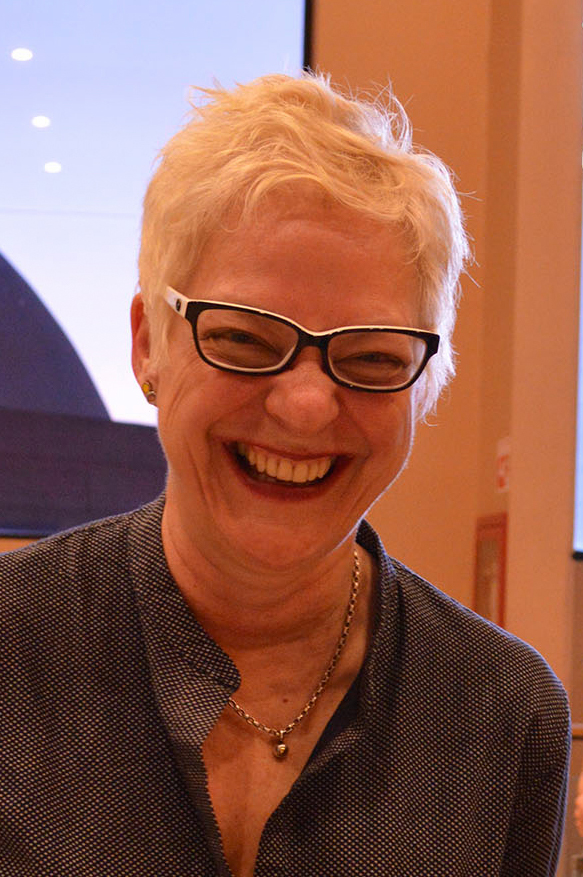
- Born: Kathryn High; 1954 (age 71–72); Bryn Mawr, PA
- Education: State University of New York, Buffalo; Colgate University
- Known for: BioArt video art performance art

Kathryn High (born 1954) is an American interdisciplinary artist, curator, and scholar known for her work in BioArt, video art and performance art.

== Background ==
Kathy High graduated with a BA from Colgate University in 1976 and an MAH from the Center for Media Studies at University at Buffalo in 1981 where she studied with media pioneers Tony Conrad, Hollis Frampton, and Steina Vasulka. High was a founding member of The Standby Program in New York City and initiated the video exhibition program at Hallwalls Contemporary Art Center in Buffalo, NY in the 1980s.

High's single-channel video works include documentary and experimental forms. Video Data Bank describes her videos as incorporating archival footage, interviews, fictional material, and irony, with subjects including body politics, science fiction, and the paranormal. This work connects her to video art practices that developed from the media arts environment in which she trained.

In 1991, she founded FELIX: A Journal of Media Arts and Communication produced in conjunction with The Standby Program. She is co-editor of The Emergence of Video Processing Tools: Television Becoming Unglued, with Sherry Miller Hocking and Mona Jimenez. She has been a professor of video and new media at Rensselaer Polytechnic Institute in Troy, New York since 2002.

The Emergence of Video Processing Tools: Television Becoming Unglued addresses the history of some of the first video processing tools that were constructed by inventors and artists in the latter part of the 1960s and 1970s. This work is concerned with the efforts of inventors, designers, and artists who created tools for capturing, transforming, and manipulating video images.

Since the early 1980s, High has been creating and exhibiting art in the form of videos, photographs, performances and installations. High's work intersects art, technology and science (often collaborating with scientists) and addresses topics including gender and technology, empathy, and animal sentience. Her work has appeared in the Guggenheim Museum, Catalyst Arts, MASS MoCA, and the Museum of Modern Art among others and she has received grants from the National Endowment for the Arts, Rockefeller Foundation, and New York State Council on the Arts.

High's video works are distributed through Video Data Bank and her films I Need Your Full Cooperation/Underexposed and Underexposed are distributed by Women Make Movies.

== Notable works ==
- Animal Attraction - a video documentary about telepathic communication with animals. Animal Attraction was first exhibited at the Guggenheim Museum in New York City, and was additionally featured on PBS and WNET in New York City.
- Death Down Under - a video documentary, co-directed by Cynthia White, focuses on care for the dead, green burials, and the ecology of death.
- Blood Wars - an interdisciplinary art and science project. Blood Wars, is an ongoing experiment that pits human white blood cell samples against one another in a series of tournament-style battles. The project was funded by a 2010 fellowship from the John Simon Guggenheim Memorial Foundation with additional support from Rensselaer Polytechnic Institute.
- Embracing Animal - a performance involving live rats that was commissioned for the exhibition Becoming Animal at MASS MoCA. For this project, High purchased two rats for use in a series of biological experiments involving the artist's DNA and homeopathic medicine.
