= New York Counterpoint =

1985 composition by Steve Reich

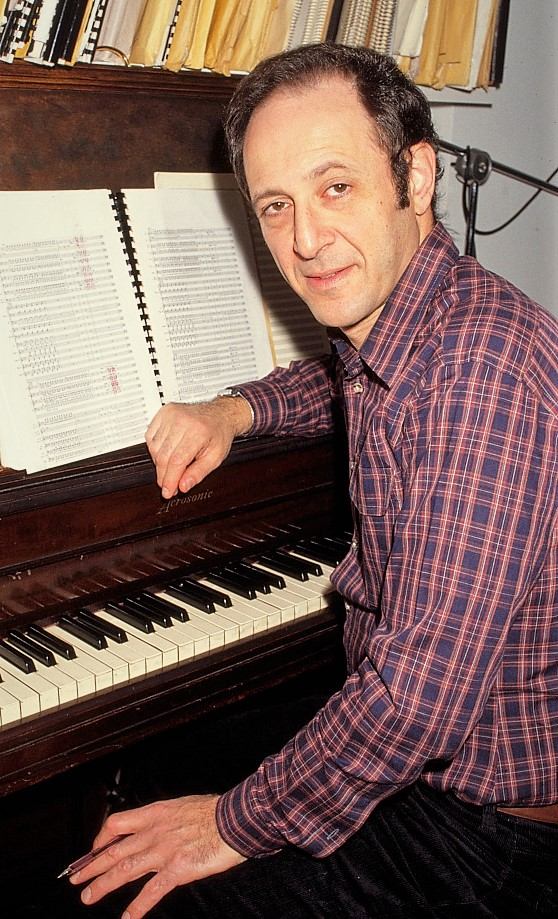
Steve Reich ca. 1982–84

New York Counterpoint for amplified clarinet and tape, or 9 clarinets and 3 bass clarinets (one part doubles B♭ and bass), is a 1985 minimalist composition written by American composer Steve Reich. The piece, intended to capture the throbbing vibrancy of Manhattan, is notable for its ability to imitate electronic sounds through acoustic instrumentation.

== History ==
The piece was commissioned in 1984 by clarinetist Richard Stoltzman for nine B-flat clarinets and three bass clarinets. This was the second in Reich's "counterpoint" series, preceded by Vermont Counterpoint (1982) for flutes, and followed by Electric Counterpoint (1987) for electric guitars and Cello Counterpoint (2003) for celli. Each of these works are scored for one live performer who plays against up to a dozen recordings of the same instrument. The canonic interplay in the composition creates multiple layers of sound, akin to Reich's earlier phase pieces. Out of the series, New York Counterpoint is considered the most rhythmically intricate and one of Reich's most well known works. The second movement of the piece was featured as a set work for Edexcel music A level between 2005 and 2016

== Composition ==
New York Counterpoint is divided into three movements known only by their suggested tempi: fast, slow and fast.

=== Movement I (Fast) ===
The opening ostinato derives from the opening of a similar Reich piece, Music for 18 Musicians (1976). Out of the synthetic pulses arises a simple melody which repeats in phase with other groupings of clarinets. The use of interlocking repeated melodic patterns, according to Reich, echoes his earlier works Piano Phase (1967) and Violin Phase (1967). The theme recapitulates the pulses in an identical harmonic progression. A larger pattern is seen here as the interlocking melodies and chordal pulses are too in phase. These resulting melodies or melodic patterns then become the basis for the following section as the other surrounding parts in the contrapuntal web fade out.

=== Movement II (Slow) ===
The second movement, while much slower, plays with the same ideas of phase shifting and melodic imitation. The persistent use of staggered repetition of melodic material is at the very heart of the movement's construction. In the nature of the patterns, the movements harmonic combination reflects the contemporaneously composed Sextet (1985). However, this movement's change of tempo is abrupt and halved, establishing an ambiguity between measured groupings. In this case, three groups of four eight notes, or four groups of three eight notes. Despite the ambiguity and phase, this movement is the most melodic of the three, making its presence strong as an interlude and catalyst for the bombastic finale.

=== Movement III (Fast) ===
The final movement of New York Counterpoint draws attention to the bass clarinets, which function to accent in prominence. The melody, presented in a slow six-eight, is sharply interrupted by an antiphonal hocket in the bass clarinet, first one and then the other while the upper clarinets remain similar. In the program notes, Reich claims that "the effect, by change of accent, is to vary the perception of that which in fact is not changing." This movement, while less focused on the obvious theme of phase and drone, takes both elements from the previous movements and slyly incorporates them into the bass clarinet line.

== Recordings ==
- New York Counterpoint/Three Elegies/Bass Clarinet & Percussion/Cinema Paradiso/25 Kärwa-Melodien/Rational Melodies/Like He Never Was/Stone: Wind: Rain: Sun, Clarinet Classics (CC 0009), 1994. Performed by Roger Heaton, clarinet, alto clarinet & contrabass clarinet.
- New York Counterpoint, Serendipity (SERCD 0200), 1996. Performed by Linda Merrick, clarinet.
- Steve Reich Gavin Bryars Lukas Ligeti Robert Carl, Lotus Records (LR 9722CD), 1997. Performed by the Vienna Saxophone Quartet.
- Works: 1965-1995, Nonesuch Records (79451-2), 1997. Performed by Evan Ziporyn, clarinet.
- Minimal Tendencies, Clarinet Classics (CC0024), 1998. Performed by the Delta Saxophone Quartet.
- American Clarinet, Virgin Classics (7243-5-453512-3), 1999. Performed by Alain Damiens, clarinet.
- Kurtág/Bartók/Faragó/Stravinsky/Reich, Budapest Music Center Records (BMC CD 048), 2001. Performed by Gellért Tihanyi, clarinet, E-flat clarinet & bass clarinet.
- City Life • New York Counterpoint • Eight Lines • Violin Phase, RCA Red Seal (74321-66459-2), 2002. Performed by Roland Diry, clarinet.
- Klarinetten-Spuren, Sillton (CP0410.P), 2002. Performed by Helmut Sprenger, clarinet.
- Ponder Nothing, Innova Recordings (Innova 564), 2002. Performed by Susan Fancher, alto & soprano saxophone, Mark Engebretson, tenor & baritone saxophone.
- Magical Place Of My Dreams, Arizona University Recordings (AUR CD3118), 2003. Performed by Richard Nunemaker, clarinets.
- Close To Home: Music Of American Composers, Albany Records (TROY1385), 2012. Performed by Michael Rowlett, clarinet.
- Counterpoint (Kuniko Plays Reich), Linn Records (CKH 485), 2014. Performed by Kuniko Kato, marimba.
- Different Traces (Works For Saxophone Solo and Electronics), GENUIN (GEN 16424), 2016. Performed by Ruth Velten, saxophone.
- New York Counterpoint, Sounds Good (SG100), 2016. Performed by Nick Shipman, clarinet.
- A Minimal Sax, Brilliant Classics (95909), 2019. Performed by the Freem Saxophone Quartet.
- Eight Lines • City Life, Naxos Records (8.559682), 2020. Performed by Andrea Nagy, clarinet.
- New York Counterpoint, Antarctica Records (AR 021), 2020. Performed by Roeland Hendrikx, clarinet.

The version on Works 1965–1995 lasts around eleven and a half minutes.
