= Electric Counterpoint =

1987 composition by Steve Reich

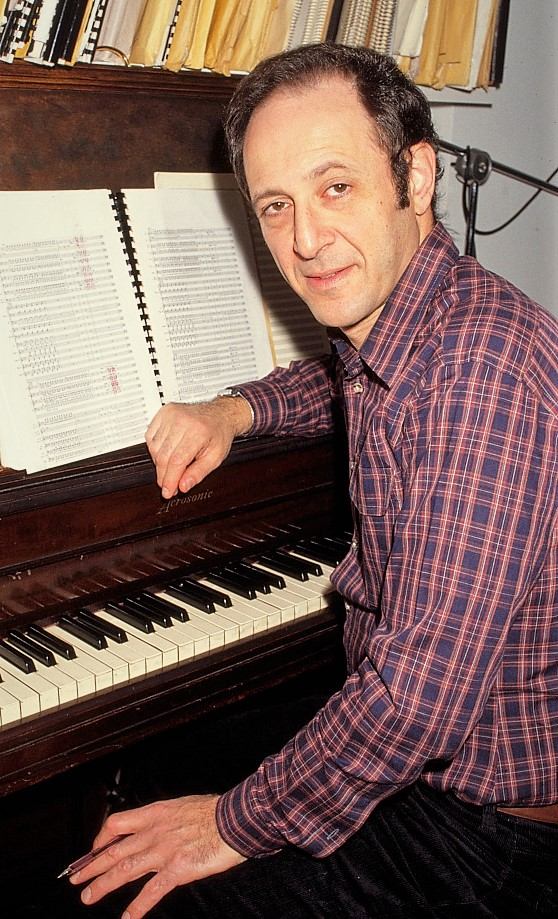
Steve Reich ca. 1982–84

Electric Counterpoint is a minimalist composition by the American composer Steve Reich. The piece consists of three movements, "Fast", "Slow", and "Fast". Reich has offered two versions of the piece: one for electric guitar and tape (the tape part featuring two electric bass guitars and up to ten electric guitars), the other for an ensemble of guitars. The work shares similarities with Reich's New York Counterpoint.

== First recording ==
Pat Metheny "Electric Counterpoint III Fast" (1989)
25 seconds of "Electric Counterpoint III Fast" performed by Pat Metheny. Composed by Steve Reich.

It was first recorded in 1987 by guitarist Pat Metheny, who made extensive use of overdubbing, and was released along with Reich's Different Trains, performed by the Kronos Quartet, on Nonesuch Records (catalogue number 979 176-2). Guitarists wishing to perform the piece may use Metheny's pre-recorded ensemble part or opt to record their own, adding the 13th guitar part in live performance. In 2007, the guitar ensemble Forestare made the first recording of the lesser known second version, on ATMA Classique.

The original recording, as included in the Works 1965–1995 box set, lasts slightly under fifteen minutes.

== Influence ==
As with other pieces by Reich, Electric Counterpoint has influenced many modern artists, such as the Orb, which sampled the third movement of the Pat Metheny recording as one of the hooks of "Little Fluffy Clouds," and RJD2, who sampled the piece's opening for his song "The Proxy" from his first release, Deadringer. In 2008 Joby Burgess' Powerplant arranged the work for Xylosynth, taking influence from Metheny and the Orb. Röyksopp released two remixes of the third movement in 2010 for free, one which follows Reich's original closely and another reinterpretation titled "Milde Salve". Since 2012, Radiohead guitarist Jonny Greenwood has performed the piece at several festivals and at concerts featuring the London Contemporary Orchestra; he recorded the piece for a Nonesuch album of Reich works titled Radio Rewrite released that same year, the title piece of which was inspired by two Radiohead songs.

The third movement was included in the Edexcel GCSE Anthology of Music, in the second area of study, "Music in the 20th Century". It was included in the video game Civilization V as one of the "great works of music" and was performed by the Bluecoats Drum and Bugle Corps during their 2015 production "Kinetic Noise".

== Recordings ==
- Electric Counterpoint, Pat Metheny soloist, 1989. CD. Included on Steve Reich: Works 1965-1995
- Electric Counterpoint, David Tanenbaum, New Albion Records, 1994. CD
- Electric Counterpoint, Röyksopp, two versions, 2010.
- Electric Counterpoint, Jonny Greenwood soloist, on the album Radio Rewrite, Nonesuch, 2014. CD/download.
- Electric Counterpoint, Yaron Deutsch soloist, on the album 33 RPM, 2020. LP/download.
- Electric Counterpoint, Pierre Bibault soloist, on the album Steve Reich, Music Square, 2021.
- Electric Counterpoint, Santiago Quintáns soloist, on the album Guitar Hero. Santiago Quintans Plays Steve Reich, Megadiscs Classics, 2021.
- Electric Counterpoint, Giacomo Baldelli soloist, on the album New York City Tracks, Halidon, 2022.
- Electric Counterpoint, Marco Maiole soloist, on the album Electric Counterpoint, PeerSouthern ITALY/Bridging the gap, 2023.
