= Juan Downey =

Chilean artist (1940–1993)

- Born: Juan Downey Alvarado; May 11, 1940; Santiago, Chile
- Died: June 9, 1993 (aged 53); New York City, New York, U.S.
- Education: Pontifical Catholic University of Chile
- Movement: Video Art, Kinetic Art

Juan Downey Alvarado (May 11, 1940 – June 9, 1993) was a Chilean artist who was a pioneer in the fields of video art and interactive art.

== Early life and education ==
Downey was born Juan Downey Alvarado in 11 May 1940, in Santiago, Chile. His father, David Downey V., was a distinguished architect in Chile, and following in his father's footsteps, Juan Downey studied to complete a Bachelor of Architecture in 1964 from the Pontifical Catholic University of Chile. In 1961, to further his studies and develop his artistic practice, Downey traveled to Europe. He spent a few months in Barcelona and Madrid, followed by Paris, where he lived for three years studying printmaking at Stanley William Hayter's legendary Atelier 17. During that time, he befriended artists Eugenio Téllez, Roberto Matta, Julio Le Parc, and Takis.

In 1965, Downey traveled to Washington, D.C., at the invitation of the Organization of American States to present a solo show of his work. It was there that Downey would meet his future wife, Marilys Belt. Downey stayed in Washington for a couple of years before moving with his family to New York in 1969. Downey was an associate professor of art at the Pratt Institute in New York from 1970 until 1993. He died in New York on June 9, 1993, as a result of cancer.

== Career ==
In New York, Downey would become involved with the groups Radical Software and Raindance collective, both of them early proponents of using video for artistic and political means.

Downey is recognized as a pioneer and early adopter of video art, but during his artistic career, he created an extensive body of work that also includes electronic and video sculptures, photography, painting, drawing, printmaking, performance, installation, and writing. Downey's drawings are especially remarkable and remained a constant practice of his. All of his major works were accompanied by drawings. They reflect not only his “sureness of hand,” as curators David Ross and James Harithas noted, but also his compelling ideas and visions, and they reveal a sustained practice of drawing over a lifetime.

The early period of Juan Downey's artistic practice consisted of painting, drawing, writing, and printmaking. After moving to the United States in 1965, he began to experiment with numerous forms of art that included creating interactive electronic sculptures, performances, happenings, and, in the late 1960s, video art. He wrote: “The universe is not an assemblage of independent parts, but an overlapping, interrelated system of energy. All my work relates to this vision.” These media permitted Downey to investigate ideas about invisible energy as well as to invite active participation by viewers of his work.

Two seminal series in Downey's career were Video Trans Americas, begun in 1971, and The Thinking Eye, begun in the mid-1970s. Video Trans Americas (VTA.) is often divided into two groups: the first group was developed from 1973 to 1976, and the second from 1976 to 1977. The two series stress Downey's preoccupation with political discourse, the self, the history of art, Western civilization, and Latin American identity.

== Exhibitions ==
=== Solo exhibitions ===
Solo exhibitions featuring Juan Downey's work include:

- Juan Downey: Audio-Kinetic Electronic Sculptures, The Corcoran Gallery of Art in Washington DC, (1969);
- With Energy Beyond These Walls, Howard Wise Gallery, New York, NY, (1970);
- Video Trans Americas, Contemporary Art Museum, Houston, TX, (1976);
- Juan Downey: Video Trans Americas, Whitney Museum of American Art, New York, NY, (1976);
- Video Trans Americas, Everson Museum of Art, Syracuse, NY (1977);
- Juan Downey: New American Filmmaker Series, Whitney Museum of American Art, New York, NY (1978);
- Juan Downey, Matrix/Berkeley 16, University Art Museum, Berkeley, CA (1978);
- Une Forêt 'Videoformes': Retrospective Juan Downey, Festival de la Création Vidéo, Clermont-Ferrand, France (1993);
- Juan Downey: Instalaciones, Dibujos y Videos, Museo Nacional de Bellas Artes, Santiago (1995), Chile;
- Juan Downey: Con energía más allá de estos muros, Institut Valencià d'Art Modern, Centre del Carme, Valencia, Spain (1997–98);
- Retrospectiva de Video Arte de Juan Downey, Museo de Arte Moderno de Chiloé, Castro, Chiloé, Chile (2000);
- Plateau of Humankind, Honorable Mention: “Excellence in Art Science and Technology,” 49th Venice Biennale Chilean Pavilion, Venice, Italy (2001);
- Juan Downey: El ojo pensante, Sala de Arte Fundación Telefónica, Santiago, Chile (2010);
- Juan Downey: The Invisible Architect, MIT List Visual Arts Center, Cambridge, MA, Arizona State University Art Museum, Tempe, AZ, The Bronx Museum of the Arts, NY (2011–2012)
- Juan Downey una utopía de la comunicación, Museo Rufino Tamayo, Mexico City (2013)

=== Group exhibitions ===
Downey's work was included in numerous group exhibitions as follows.

- Some More Beginnings: An Exhibition of Submitted Works Involving Technical Materials and Processes, organized by Experiments in Art and Technology, in collaboration with the Brooklyn Museum, Brookly, NY and The Museum of Modern Art, New York, NY (1968);
- Kinesthetics, Howard Wise Gallery, New York, 1969-70;
- New Learning Spaces & Places, Walker Art Center, Minneapolis, MN (1974);
- Whitney Biennial Exhibition, Whitney Museum of American Art, New York, NY (1975, 1977, 1981, 1983, 1985, 1987, 1989, 1991);
- Documenta 6, Kassel, Germany, (1977);
- Venice Biennale, US Pavilion, Venice, Italy, (1980);
- Sydney Biennale, Sydney, Australia, (1982);
- II Bienal de La Habana, Havana, Cuba, (1986);
- The Thinking Eye, International Center for Photography, New York, NY, (1987);
- Passages de l’image, Musée national d'Art moderne- Centre Georges Pompidou, Paris, France, (1990);
- Video Art: The First 25 Years, The Museum of Modern Art, and The American Federation of Arts, New York, NY, (1995);
- Info Art ’95, Kwangju Biennale, Kwangju, Korea, (1995);
- Electronic Highways, The Museum of Modern Art, New York, NY, (1997);
- Rational/Irrational, Haus der Kulturen der Welt, Berlin, Germany, (2008-2009)
- The Looking Glass: Artist Immigrants of Washington, American University Art Museum, Washington, DC (2016)
- VIVA ART VIVA, Venice Biennale, Venice, Italy, (2017);

== Selected works ==
=== Interactive art ===
- Against Shadows, 1968, is an interactive artwork that uses a grid of photo sensors to translate shadow thrown by the human body to a matching grid of wall-mounted lightbulbs.
- In Invisible Energy Dictates a Dance Concert, 1969-1970, readings taken by geiger counters are sent by walkie-talkies to dancers in different rooms of the gallery.
- Three-Way Communication by Light, 1972, used video, super 8 film and laser beams to join the actions of three performers painted in whiteface.
- Plato Now, 1973

=== Performance art ===
- Imperialistic Octopus, 1972
- Energy Fields, 1972
- Video Trans Americas Debriefing Pyramid, 1974

=== Video art ===
==== Early works ====
- Fresh Air, 3/4" NTSC format, b/w 16 min., 1971
- Plato Now, b/w, 30 min., 9 channels, 1972
- Monument to the Charles River, b/w, 27 min., 2 channels, 1973
- Rewe, video installation, 1991

==== Video Trans Americas ====
The Video Trans Americas (VTA) Series was a video-installation composed of videos recorded with a Sony portapak during Downey’s travels from North to Central and South America between 1973 and 1976. The first complete screening of the VTA video-installation was in the exhibition Landscape Studies in Video curated by David Ross at the Long Beach Museum of Art in 1975. The VTA video-installation in subsequent exhibitions at other museum institutions such as the Whitney Museum of American Art (1976) was exhibited differently. This was largely due to the spatial component entailed in the presentation of the work, a key concern for Downey, as well as his own artistic liberty to make changes or integrate other components in the installation. Therefore, there are a number of different versions in the way the VTA video installation was exhibited. The following videos were included in the installation:

- Rumbo al Golfo, b/w, 27 min., 1973
- Zapoteca, b/w, 27 min., 1973
- Yucatán, 1973
- Chile, color, 13 min., 1974
- Guatemala, b/w, 27 min., 1973
- New York/Texas I & II, b/w, 27 min., 2 channels, 1974
- Nazca I & II, b/w 11 min., 2 channels, 1974
- Lima/Machu Picchu, b/w, 27 min., 1975
- Cuzco I & II, 1976
- Inca I & II, 1976
- Uros I & II, 1975
- La Frontera I & II, 1976

Additional videos that are part of the VTA series:

- Moving, b/w, 27 min., 1974
- Publicness, b/w, 30 min., 1974
- Central Zone, b/w, 27 min., 1975
- Videodances, b/w, 30 min., 1975
- Inca Split, 1976
- Bi-Deo, 1976
- In the Beginning, 1976
- Guahibos, color, 26 min. 1976
- Yanomami Healing I, b/w, 1977
- Yanomami Healing II, b/w, 1977
- The Circle of Fires, 1978 (video installation comes in 2 versions)
- More Than Two, 1978 (installation)
- The Abandoned Shabono, 1979
- The Laughing Alligator, 1979
- Chiloe, color, 18 min., 1981
- Chicago Boys, color, 16 min., stereo, 1982–83
- About Cages, 1986 (installation)
- The Motherland, 1986
- The Return of the Motherland, 1989

==== The Thinking Eye Series ====
- Las Meninas (Maids of Honor), color, 20 min., 1975
- Venus and Her Mirror, 1980 (video-installation)
- The Looking Glass, 1981
- Information Withheld, 1983
- Shifters, 1984
- Sinage, 1984 (video-installation)
- Obelisk, 1985 (video-installation)
- J.S. Bach, 1986
- Bachdisc, 1988 (interactive video-disc)
- Hard Times and Culture: Part One, Vienna fin-de-siecle, 1990

== Collections ==
Downey’s work can be found in private collections and in the collections of major museums. Selected museum collections include:

- The Tate Modern, London, UK;
- The Museum of Modern Art, New York, NY;
- Centre Pompidou/Musée National d’Art Moderne, Paris, France;
- Museo Nacional Centro de Arte Reina Sofía, Madrid, Spain;
- The Smithsonian American Art Museum, Washington, DC, and
- Museo Nacional de Bellas Artes, Santiago, Chile, among others.

== Awards ==
Downey was a Guggenheim fellow in the area of fine arts in 1971.

== Selected bibliography ==
- Valerie Smith, ed. Juan Downey: The Invisible Architect. Leipzig: MIT List Visual Art Center & The Bronx Museum, 2011.
- González, Julieta, Nicolás Guagnini, Carla Macchiavello, and Valerie Smith. Juan Downey: el ojo pensante. Santiago: Fundación Telefónica, 2010.
- Arévalo, Antonio, Marilys Belt de Downey, Juan Downey, José Goñi Carrasco, and Luisa Ulibarri Lorenzini. Juan Downey: La Biennale di Venezia, 49 Esposizione Internazionale d’Arte. Milan: Rodrigo Figueroa Schirmer, 2001.
- Bonet, Eugeni, Douglas Davis, Juan Downey, Nuria Enguita, Coco Fusco, Juan Guardiola, John G. Hanhardt, James Harithas, and David Ross. Juan Downey: With Energy Beyond These Walls (Con energía más allá de estos muros). Valencia: Institut Valencià d’Art Modern and Centre del Carme, 1997-98.
- Hanhardt, John G., and Ann D. Hoy. Juan Downey of Dream Into Study. Santiago: Editorial Lord Cochrane, 1987.
