= Raindance Foundation =

Raindance Foundation (RainDance Corporation) was founded in October 1969 by Frank Gillette, Paul Ryan, Michael Shamberg, Louis Jaffe, and Marco Vassi. Raindance was a self-described "alternate culture think-tank" that embraced video as an alternative form of cultural communication.

The name "RainDance Corporation" was an ironic reference to the mainstream organization Rand Corporation. Influenced by the communications theories of Marshall McLuhan and Buckminster Fuller, the collective produced a data bank of tapes and writings that explored the relation of cybernetics, media, and ecology. From 1970 to 1974, Raindance published the seminal video journal Radical Software (initially edited by Beryl Korot and Phyllis Gershuny), which provided a network of communications for the emerging alternative video movement with a circulation of 5,000. In 1971, Dean and Dudley Evenson joined the Raindance Foundation and taught video workshops through the Metropolitan Museum of Art under a grant from the New York State Council on the Arts. Dean Evenson was instrumental in hooking up the first half inch video transmission through New York City's Sterling Manhattan Cable, thus paving the way for Public Access Television. Dudley Evenson co-edited Issue #5 of Radical Software with Michael Shamberg. In 1971, Shamberg wrote Guerrilla Television, a summary of the group's principles and a blueprint for the decentralization of television.

In 1976, Raindance members Ira Schneider and Beryl Korot edited Video Art: An Anthology, one of the first readers on video art. The original Raindance collective dispersed in the mid-1970s.

The nonprofit Raindance Foundation continued and in the 1980s produced the first comprehensive TV series on video art called "Night Light TV" which showcased video works by William Wegman, Ira Schneider, Russ Johnson (of Taly and Russ Johnson), Joan Jonas, Juan Downey, John Sturgeon, and Willoughby Sharp. Raindance also administered The Standby Program at Matrix, bringing video editing to artists in the 1980s and 1990s.
