= The Cave (opera) =

1993 opera by Steve Reich

- Multimedia opera by Steve Reich
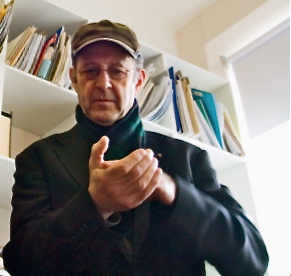
- The composer in 2006
- Language: English
- Based on: The Cave of the Patriarchs
- Premiere: October 22, 1993; Vienna

The Cave is a multimedia opera in three acts by Steve Reich to an English libretto by his wife Beryl Korot. It was first performed in 1993 in Vienna by the Steve Reich Ensemble, conducted by Paul Hillier. The title "The Cave" refers to The Cave of the Patriarchs in Hebron, where Abraham and Sarah (and several other major religious figures) are buried.

The Cave of the Patriarchs is of unusual interest in that it is a sacred place where Muslims, Jews and Christians pray. The music and a major part of the libretto in the opera is derived directly from, and includes spoken responses from, Israeli, Palestinian and American interviewees who were asked questions about the story of Abraham. The sound track also includes readings from the religious texts that detail the story of Abraham, and a recording of the ambient sound that is found in the ancient building that surrounds the sacred site.

The opera uses recorded speech as a source for melodies, a technique that Steve Reich first used in the 1988 Different Trains.

== Plot ==
The main narrative thread that runs through the opera is the story of the life of Abraham, as it is told in the various religious texts, and how this story is now understood and interpreted, using modern-day accounts by individual people from three different major religious and cultural contexts. During the individual interviews, Steve Reich and Beryl Korot asked questions such as "Who is Abraham?", "Who is Sarah?" and "Who is Ishmael?" and recorded answers that were given by Israeli, Palestinian and American interviewees. These three groups of people viewed the story of Abraham/Ibrahim and his immediate family in varying ways.

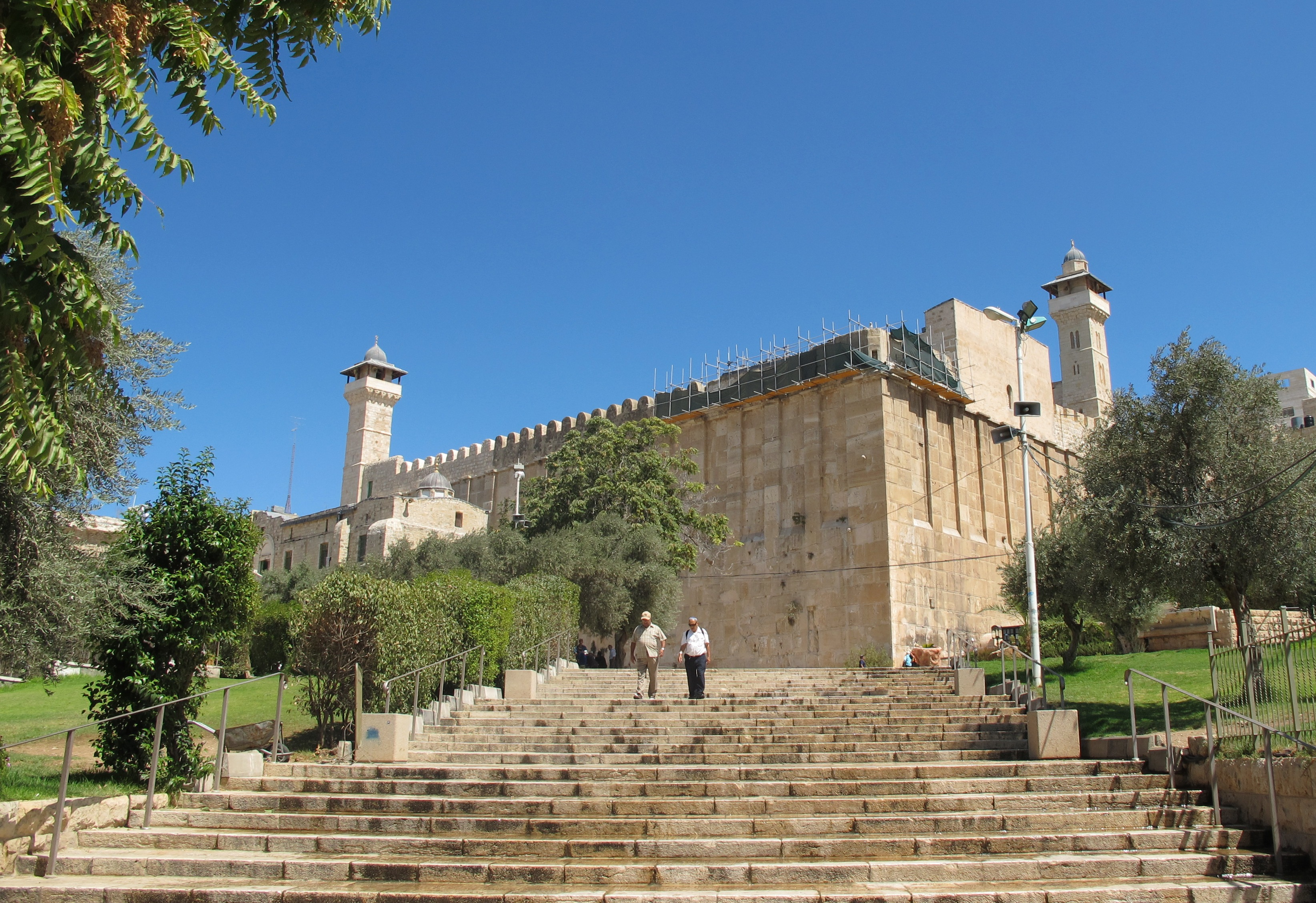
The Cave of the Patriarchs in Hebron, West Bank, which is the place the opera refers to in its title.

Brief spoken extracts from the interviews were used both as they were recorded during the interviews, but also as repeated musical phrases. The melodic phrases used in the opera are all taken directly from the intonation, tone, stress, and rhythm of the natural spoken phrases and sentences used by the individuals interviewed. In other words, the musical phrases are based on the prosody which can be heard in the phrases and sentences spoken by the individuals. Images of the interviewees are also shown on an array of video screens.

=== Act I ===
1. Typing Music (Genesis XVI)
2. Who is Abraham?
3. Genesis XII
4. Who is Sarah?
5. Who is Hagar?
6. Typing Music Repeat
7. Who is Ishmael?
8. Genesis XVIII
9. Who is Isaac?
10. Genesis XXI
11. The casting out of Ishmael and Hagar
12. Machpelah Commentary
13. Genesis XXV (chanted in Hebrew from the Torah by Ephrim Isaac)
14. Interior of the Cave

=== Act II ===
1. Surah 3 (chanted in Arabic from the Koran by Sheikh Dahoud Atalah, Muqri of Al-Aksa Mosque)
2. Who is Ibrahim?
3. Who is Hajar?
4. The near sacrifice
5. El Khalil Commentary
6. Interior of the cave

=== Act III ===
1. Who is Abraham?
2. Who is Sarah?
3. Who is Hagar?
4. Who is Ishmael?
5. The Binding of Isaac
6. The Cave of Macpelah

== Performers ==
- Vocal Quartet: 2 Sopranos, Tenor, Baritone
- 2 reed players (flute, oboe, cor anglais, clarinet, bass clarinet)
- 4 percussionists (vibraphone, marimbaphone, bass drum, kick bass drums, claves)
- 3 keyboard players (piano, sampler, computer keyboards)
- String quartet (2 violins, viola, cello)
