= First Presbyterian Church (Miami, Florida) =

Coordinates: 25.767676°N 80.189577°W

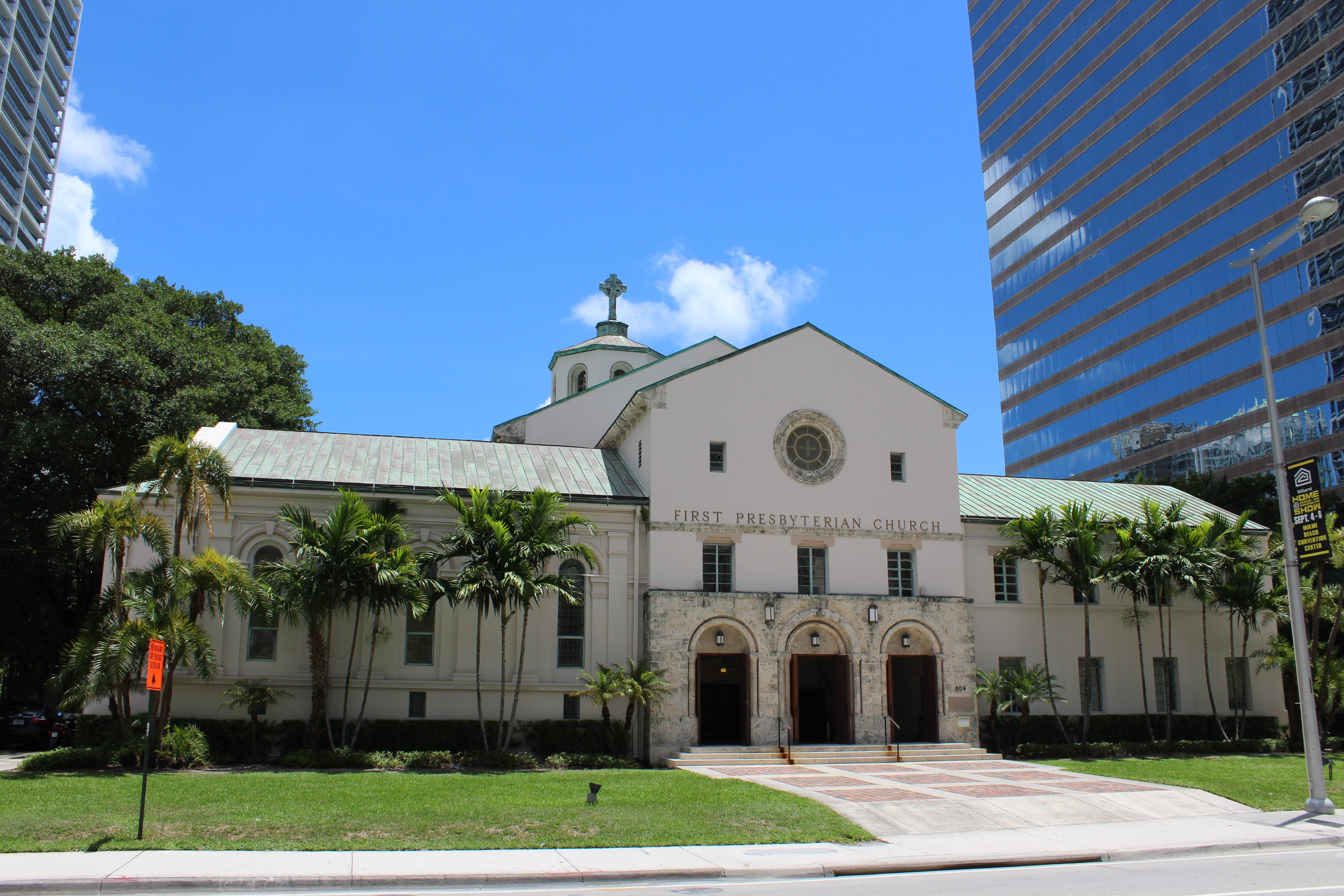
From Brickell Avenue

First Presbyterian Church is a historic church in Miami, Florida, USA. It is located at 609 Brickell Avenue in Greater Downtown Miami. Built in 1949, it was placed on the National Register of Historic Places in 1989 (submitted in 1988), and designated historic by the City of Miami in 2003. The congregation dates back as far as the city of Miami, 1896, with the original building on another property being funded by Henry Flagler in 1900. The architect of the current building was Lester Geisler. The building represents a late example of the Mediterranean Revival architecture, popular in South Florida earlier in the century. The building sits on a three-acre property surrounded by high-rises. Built for a congregation of over 1,000, church membership dwindled from 1400 to less than 150 by the early aughts.

In 2018, under the leadership of Pastor Christopher Atwood, the church incurred a $7.1 million tax bill by the Miami-Dade Property Appraiser. This is due to claims that the church leased the property to for-profit entities such as a school and food trucks thus violating the religious exception rule.

== 609 Brickell skyscraper ==
In 2023, a proposal moved forward to build an 80-storey, 1,000-foot (300 m)+ supertall skyscraper on the waterfront behind the church, replacing a surface parking lot, while the church would be preserved and possibly expanded into a space in the new tower. The sale of the 2.2 acre (.9 hectare) lot was valued at $240 million.
