= Trikonic =

Triadic analysis-synthesis technique

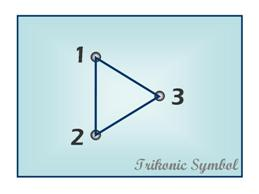
Figure 1.0: The Trikonic Symbol or ‘trikon’ represents three categorical elements and their relationship for the subject in consideration

Trikonic, is a proposed method of philosophical analysis-synthesis. It is based on Charles Sanders Peirce's "trichotomic", which he described in 1888 as "the art of making three-fold divisions". Trikonic, or "diagrammatic trichotomic", was developed by Gary Richmond in 2005.

== Peircean Category Theory ==
A major part of trikonic analysis is the three Peircean categories; these consist of firstness, secondness and thirdness:

- "Firstness is the mode of being that of which is such as it is, positively and without reference to anything else.
- Secondness is the mode of being that which is such as it is, with respect to a second but regardless of any third.
- Thirdness is the mode of being that which is such as it is, in bringing a second and third into relation to each other."

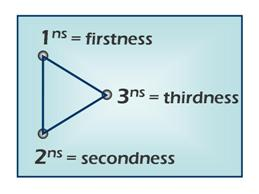
Figure 2.0 The Three Peircean Categories

Another way of describing the basic understanding of these notions is from Sowa:

“First is the conception of being or existing independent of anything else. Second is the conception of being relative to, the conception of reaction, with something else. Third is the conception of mediation, whereby a first and a second are brought into relation. (1891)”

Trikonically represented, the categories are (Figure 2.0):

There are many ways in which these notions can be interpreted. These can be represented as:

Peirce's Three Universes of Experience (Figure 3.0):

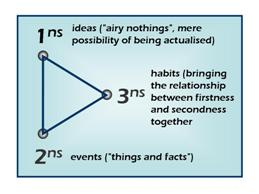
Figure 3.0 Peirce's Three Universes of Experience:

These in turn represent Peirce's three Universal Categories (Figure 4.0 The Universal Categories):

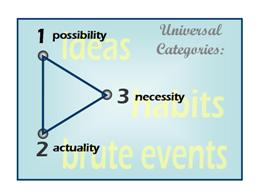
Figure 4.0 The Universal Categories:

In addition to the universal categories, there are equivalent Existential Categories (Figure 5.0 The Existential Categories):

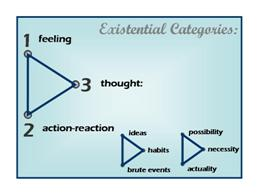
Figure 5.0 The Existential Categories:

We can also trikonically analyse thought, by identifying three Logical Modalities (Figure 6.0 The Logical Modalities):

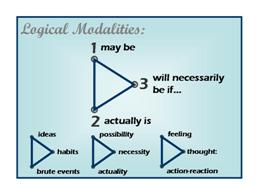
Figure 6.0 The Logical Modalities:

With these representations in mind, firstness, secondness and thirdness can be defined as the following:

- Firstness is concerned with ideas, character, qualities, feeling, image and possibility.
- Secondness signifies events, brute actions, reactions, existence and character.
- Thirdness brings together firstness in relation to secondness.

== Vector Analysis ==
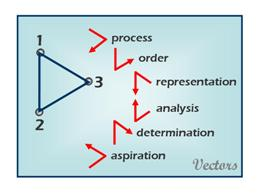
Figure 7.0 The Vectors

There are six vectors that can be used in trikonic vector analysis; these are shown in Figure 7.0.

These six vectors have also been referred to as “directions of movement through the trikon” (Richmond, 2005). They are permutations of the triad, i.e. they are different arrangements of the order of firstness, secondness and thirdness. They represent the relationships between firstness (1ns), secondness (2ns) and thirdness (3ns) for the object that is being analysed.

- Vector of Process – (1ns) chance sporting, then follows patterns of habit formation (3ns) which leads to some actual structural change in an organism (2ns).
- Vector of Order – thesis (1ns), subsequently antithesis (2ns) leading to synthesis (3ns).
- Vector of Representation – An engineer (3ns) create a CAD drawing (1ns) of a signalling design (2ns).
- Vector of Analysis – 3ns which involves 2ns which in turn involves 1ns.
- Vector of Determination – The object determines (2ns) a sign (1ns) for an interpretant (3ns).
- Vector of Aspiration - (2ns), (3ns), (1ns), represents the unique character specifically in human community development.

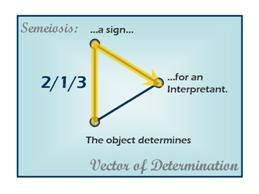
Figure 8.0 The Determination Vector

Within trikonic are six directions, which are all permutations of logical paths of relations keeping the notion of 1ns, 2ns and 3ns throughout the object under consideration.

You can interpret these in many ways, for example, the Determination Vector and Representation Vector (Please refer to Figure 8.0 and Figure 9.0).

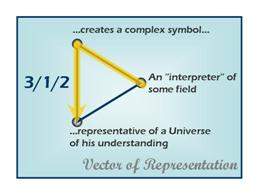
Figure 9.0 The Representation Vector

The reasoning behind the exploration of the six vectors within the triad aims at bringing a new view on analysis and a more systematic treatment to some of the difficult issues which arise especially in semiotic analysis, i.e. the vector process is a graphically logical analysis with aspects of dependence and constraint, and correlation, which tie in with the "living" reflection of the categories by the semiotic triad.

The reasoning behind the vector analysis is to use the permutations within the triad for the theory and any actual semiosis, mostly the analysis of complex virtual communicative projects. Semiosis is defined as:

"Semiosis is the making or production of meaning. The term was introduced by Charles Peirce (1839-1914) to describe the process of signification within the science of signs now termed semiology."

== Trikonic Analysis in HCI ==
Richmond suggests that “not all things can be trikonically analysed” (2005). However, there has been investigation into whether trikonic can be applied to HCI related issues. Especially, those issues concerned with websites and culture, trikonic analysis using the Peircean Category Theory has been used to analyse how trust is invoked in a user when using websites. It may be possible to use 1ns, 2ns and 3ns to categorise features of a website, for example the visual elements, colours or text used, layout, the content of the website, credibility, how the elements relate to the users actual purpose of using the website etc.

One of the purposes of trikonic is to explore whether it can help to identify what elements of a website actually influence the user to perceive it to be credible or not.

== Trikonic Analysis on the Interoperability of Conceptual Graph (CG) Tools ==
When approaching software problems like the interoperability of CG tools, it is often useful to look at a situation from a software engineering perspective to find a solution. However, with the use of trikonic it is possible to approach the software engineering problem in this way. Trikonic analysis is a very sophisticated method, and as shown in the examples above it can be used in many different ways and scenarios. Again, using the notions of 1ns, 2ns and 3ns it may be possible to see how certain elements of the CG tools relate to each other in this way and produce a good solution from this.

Examples of the three categories could be the programming language, the CG language and the architecture of the software. From this you could say, that:

“this CG language is a possibility” (1ns), “the programming language needs to be…” (2ns), “the architecture of the software is…” (3ns).

== See also ==
- Categories (Peirce)
- Semiosis
- Thesis, antithesis, synthesis
