= Vermont Counterpoint =

1982 composition by Steve Reich

Vermont Counterpoint is a minimalist composition for amplified flute and tape written by the American composer Steve Reich in 1982. It was commissioned and premiered by the flutist Ransom Wilson. The piece has a duration of roughly 10 minutes and is dedicated to the American philanthropist Betty Freeman.
