= Scott Huckabay =

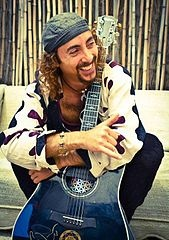
- Scott Huckabay ₪

Background information
- Genres: World music, fingerstyle, new-age, sound healing
- Occupations: Musician, composer, artist, environmentalist
- Instruments: Acoustic guitar, piano, handpan
- Years active: 1987–present
- Label: Soundings of the Planet
- Website: Sonic Alchemyst

Scott Huckabay is an American composer, acoustic and electric guitarist, pianist, handpan player, and poet.

== Background ==
Huckabay is a world-touring musician and composer known for his live guitar performances and original music. On August 16, 1987, during the weekend of the Harmonic Convergence, he was involved in a high-speed collision with a truck while riding his motorcycle in Tempe, Arizona. Allegedly, after waking up in the hospital recovery room, a steel-string acoustic guitar was found at the foot of the bed, left by an unknown source. Huckabay says that on touching the guitar, he discovered that creating sounds on the guitar helped relieve the pain from his injuries.

He immediately began developing his own unique style of playing. In that same year, a Michael Hedges concert was a major influence for Huckabay. While living in Hawaii in late 1991, Huckabay continued refining his guitar technique. Huckabay claims that while swimming in the ocean, he developed a form of sound with telepathy, which he believes enables him to communicate with the dolphins and whales on a daily basis. There is no documentation of this claim and no scientific literature supporting this type of communication. According to Huckabay, these sounds became an integral part of his music. He started performing live shows in Hawaii at the Hawaii Slam and the West Coast, including California, Washington, Oregon, and Arizona, and touring the rest of the world. Scott is a descendant of the Chiricahua Apache Nde Nation.

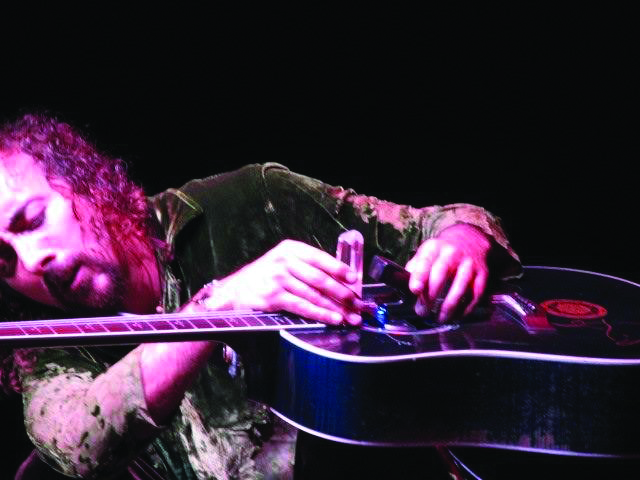
Huckabay playing guitar with quartz crystal

== Music career ==
In 1991, Huckabay won the BAM magazine 'Guitarist of the Year' contest held at the Roxy Theatre (West Hollywood). November 11, 1992, Huckabay joined an all-star line up for the free Kauai Hurricane Iniki survivors concert, which also included Crosby, Stills and Nash, Bonnie Raitt, Jimmy Buffett, Jackson Browne and Titus Kinimaka and the Kauai Boys. CSN, Bonnie, Jimmy, and Jackson had just played two nights on Oahu, with the Pahinui Brothers, raising money for the victims of the hurricane that swept Kauai two months earlier. Huckabay had been living on a secluded beach when the massive Hurricane Iniki hit the island during a full moon on September 11, 1992.

In 1995, Huckabay produced his debut album, "Virtual Altar", recorded live on the boardwalk in Venice Beach, California. In 1996, he recorded, "Peace Dance", and in 1999, "Alchemy", which won the 2000 Independent Visionary Award. He currently records various production projects with Soundings of the Planet, their motto, 'Peace through Music'.

In 1999, Huckabay performed at various ancient sites in Egypt and claimed to have found a harmonic and spiritual affinity with an ancient site called the Dendera Temple complex that resonated with musical frequencies. On December 31, 1999, Huckabay performed a concert inside the Great Pyramid of Giza. Two months later, Scott released the album, 'Temple of Dendara'. Scott tunes his guitar intuitively to one of the Solfeggio frequencies which are claimed to affect or improve various aspects of physical or mental health. In 2006, Huckabay released the album, Secret Portal, produced by Sylvia Massy at RadioStar Studios in Mt Shasta, California.

== Guitar gear ==
Huckabay plays a 2001 custom built 610CE Taylor Guitar (nicknamed "Oceana") with a combination of a Sunrise S-1 magnetic pickup and several custom Fishman piezo pickups embedded in various locations inside the wood of the guitar to capture percussive sounds built by Bob Taylor (luthier) of Taylor Guitars. He is left handed and experiments with a variety of guitar effects pedals by Boss Corporation. He also uses a violin bow, EBow, Morley Pedals, quartz crystal and an RC-20 Loop Station by Roland Corporation to layer guitar rhythmic patterns. Making use of this equipment, he claims to equalize precisely the live sound from his instrument to achieve different sounds for every song within each concert venue. Scott has created over 300 alternate guitar tunings. Scott uses custom gauge Ernie Ball guitar strings.

Three-minute sound clip of Scott Huckabay playing guitar inside the Great Pyramid, Giza, Egypt.

== Discography ==
=== Studio albums ===
- Peace Dance (Soundings of the Planet) (1996)
- Alchemy (Soundings of the Planet (1999)]
- Virtual Altar (Sonic Alchemyst) (2000)
- Temple of Dendara (Sonic Alchemyst) (2003)
- Secret Portal (Sonic Alchemyst) (2006)
- Synesthesia (Sonic Alchemyst) (2015)

=== Compilations (solo) ===
- Harmonic Reflections (Sonic Alchemyst) (2014)

=== Compilations (various artists) ===
- Sacred Canyons (Soundings of the Planet) (2025)
- Healing Resonance (Soundings of the Planet) (2020)
- Golden Spiral (Soundings of the Planet) (2016)
- Harmonic Way (Soundings of the Planet) (2014)
- 'State of Profusion' featured on Vapor Trails: The Echoes Living Room Concerts Volume 14 (2008)
- Chakra Healing (Soundings of the Planet) (2008)
- Eagle River (Soundings of the Planet) (2007)
- Mountain Meadow Meditation with Dean Evenson (Soundings of the Planet) (2003)
- Sound Yoga with Dean Evenson (Soundings of the Planet) (2003)
- Sound Massage with Dean Evenson (Soundings of the Planet) (2002)
- Healing Sanctuary with Dean Evenson (Soundings of the Planet) (2002)
- 'DreamState' featured on Creative Independent Music Alliance CD Compilation (2001)
- Spirit Rising (Soundings of the Planet) (2001)
- Healing Dreams with Dean Evenson (Soundings of the Planet) (2001)
- Native Healing (Soundings of the Planet) (2001)
- Sonic Tribe (Soundings of the Planet) (2000)
- Tao of Healing with Dean Evenson (Soundings of the Planet) (2000)
- 'Neptune’s Forest' featured on NPR's Echoes Living Room Concert Compilation CD Volume#5 (1999)
- 'Emerald Sea' featured on Natural Wonders Music Sampler (1998)
- Sound Healing with Dean Evenson (Soundings of the Planet) (1998)
- Healing Waters with Dean Evenson (Soundings of the Planet) (1997)

== Poetry ==
- Angels of the Sea: Sacred Dolphin Art of Atlantis co-collaborated with Michelle Gold. Poetry book inspired by wild dolphins from around the world. Published by Hay House (1996)

== Television/film ==
- "Dolphin Dreams" featured soundtrack on Templayed Vol 1 - Healing Through Temple Visuals (2007)
- Huckabay's music was highlighted in the eighth season of MTV's reality television series Real World Hawaii (1999)
