= Ira Schneider =

American artist

Ira Schneider (1939 – August 17, 2022) was an American video artist. He has been living and working in Berlin since 1993 until his return to the US in 2021.

== Early life and career ==
Schneider was born in Manhattan, NY and raised in Brooklyn and Long Island. In 1964, he graduated from Brown University as Bachelor of Arts and, in 1964, from the University of Wisconsin–Madison in Psychology as Magister of Arts. His short film, Lost in Cuddihy (1966), received the certificate of merit. In 1993, he moved to Berlin. In 2021, he returned to the US and lived in New York.

Schneider started shooting video in 1969 with the advent of portable video recording equipment. The great number of his works include video installations from 1969 through today. Notable works include: Wipe Cycle (with Frank Gillette, 1969), The Woodstock Festival (1969), Manhattan is an Island (1977), Timezones, (1984) shown in Brussels, as well as in New York, London, Vienna, Lyon and Mannheim. A Weekend on the Beach with Jean-Luc Godard (1984, with Wim Wenders, H. Müller, and more.), Gretta (with Russ Johnson 1988), World Trade Center (1989), Nam June Paik is eating Sushi in South Beach (1998), TV as a Creative Medium (updated 2001), Brazil, the sleeping Giant (2001), Datenraum Deutschland.

Ira Schneider was president of Raindance Foundation (1972 to 1994), director of the TV show Night Light TV (1980–1992), and associate professor at the Cooper Union School of Art, New York (1980 to 92). In 1976, he worked on Video Art - an Anthology together with Beryl Korot.
