= Radical Software =

American art journal

Radical Software was an early journal on the use of video as an artistic and political medium, started in 1970 in New York City. At the time, the term radical software referred to the content of information rather than to a computer program.

== History ==
The founders of Radical Software video journal were Phyllis Gershuny (Segura) and Beryl Korot.

The video journal was begun with a questionnaire sent to a wide variety of interested people. The first issue was a creative editing of the answers to the questionnaire plus some additional special articles. The most outstanding element of Radical Software video journal was the style and emphasis used in editing. The content itself was a call to pay attention to the way information itself is disseminated. And it was a call to encourage a grassroots involvement in creating an information environment exclusive of broadcast and corporate media. It became immediately important and popular as it grasped fully what a lot of people had been concerned with and thinking about; giving its introduction a synchronicity of the ideas of the day.

Its editing was ultimately taken over by its original publisher, Raindance Corporation, a loosely formed group of like-minded videographers: some with a philosophical bent, painters, and an aspiring Hollywood producer. Michael Shamberg who went on to become a Hollywood producer co-edited Issue #5 of Radical Software along with Dudley Evenson. Dudley's husband Dean Evenson provided articles, tech drawings and cartoons. Not all members of Raindance were involved with Radical Software. Ira Schneider was added to its founders list as his importance in maintaining a mailing list and some helpful suggestions were recognized. Schneider did not edit any of the original issues. He and Korot went on to be the editors after the third issue had begun. There was a split at that time in the editorial direction and the original vision was altered to comply with that, causing a fissure and Gershuny's untimely departure. Several subsequent issues were farmed out to other groups and the format and direction shifted yet again. Eleven issues were produced before the organization folded in 1974.
