= Beryl Korot =

American visual artist

- Born: September 17, 1945
- Known for: Video art

Beryl Korot (born September 17, 1945) is an American visual artist. Her practice includes video installation, weaving, paper tapestries, digital embroidery, and drawings.

Korot is a pioneer of video art, and of multiple channel work in particular. By applying specific structures inherent to textile loom programming to the programming of multiple video channels, she brought the ancient and modern worlds of technology into conversation. This extended to a body of work on handwoven canvas in an original language based on the grid structure of woven cloth, and to a series of paintings on canvas based on this language. More recently she has created drawings which combine ink, pencil, and digitized threads, as well as large scale “tapestries” where threads are printed on paper and woven.

== Biography ==
Beryl Korot has pioneered the field of video art since the early 1970s, multiple channel work in particular. She was co-editor of Radical Software (1970), the first publication to discuss the possibilities of the new video medium, and Video Art (Harcourt, Brace, Jovanovich, 1976) with Ira Schneider. By applying specific structures inherent to loom programming to the programming of multiple channels of video, she brought the ancient and modern worlds of technology into conversation. This extended to a body of work on handwoven canvas in an original language based on the grid structure of woven cloth and to a series of paintings on canvas based on this language. More recently, she has created drawings which combine ink, pencil, and digitized threads, as well as large scale tapestries where threads are printed on paper, cut, and woven.

=== Dachau 1974 and Text and Commentary ===
Her first multiple channel works (Dachau 1974 and Text and Commentary) were seen at such diverse venues as The Kitchen (1975), Leo Castelli Gallery (1977), Documenta 6 (1977), and the Whitney Museum (1980 and 2002), Aldrich Contemporary Art Museum (2010), Tate Modern (2013), Museum of Modern Art (2017–18), ZKM Center for Art and Media Karlsruhe (2018), amongst others. Dachau 1974 is a four-channel video work, consisting of footage taken in 1974 at the former concentration camp in Dachau, Germany. The recordings focus on the symmetry of the architecture and the present ambiance of the space. Taking inspiration from the technology of the loom, Korot combined her many separate elements (in this case video footage) to develop a work in which paired channels (1 and 3; 2 and 4) conceived as threads bind the non-verbal narrative work as it proceeds in time.

Julie Warchol, writing for Art in Print, explains that Korot's Text and Commentary (1976–77) is "a seminal work that epitomizes the artist’s early investigations into the structural relationship between weaving, writing and video." Warchol further suggest that, "each component highlights the thread-by-thread and frame-by-frame construction of woven textiles and videos, respectively, as well as the writing (or drawing) that is a necessary, though often hidden, step in the process." Korot described a related epiphany she had during this time period: "I simultaneously had intensive experience working with one of the most ancient of communications technologies, the loom; one of the most modern, video; and the most prevalent, print. It is a revelation to me to realize that the information in all 3 is encoded and decoded in lines, though at greatly different speeds and through very different processes. Time is a component of all 3 in terms of how information is encoded, stored and retrieved. While instant storage and retrieval systems characterize modern technology, tactility and human memory remain earmarks of more ancient tools."

Text and Commentary consists of five video channels on five monitors that Korot recorded from a variety of perspectives as she wove. The five videos depicting the artist working at a loom appear directly across from the resulting tapestries, which are suspended from the ceiling. The viewer experiences the work while seated on a bench between the woven text of the textiles and the video commentary. The installation includes Korot's drawings and pictographic scores, which are the basis for both the textile production and video editing. The work explores the non-decorative meaning and numerical basis of abstract patterns, with Korot understanding the loom and its use of punch cards, to be an early form of communication technology. Traditionally, both weaving and computing have been understood as women's professions, but Korot examines both from a feminist perspective, moving beyond associations with both domesticity and femininity to place textile art within a canon of fine art. The installation was acquired by the Museum of Modern Art.

Dachau 1974 is in the Kramlich Collection as well as the collection of the Carl & Marilynn Thoma Foundation. It was jointly acquired by the Metropolitan Museum of Art and the Smithsonian American Art Museum in 2023. Korot's painted text-based handwoven canvases in an original language were exhibited in 1986 at the John Weber Gallery and in the Carnegie Museum of Art's 1990 exhibition Points of Departure: Origins in Video, in bitforms gallery's 2018 exhibition A Coded Language, and in LACMA's 2023 exhibition Coded: Art Enters the Computer Age, 1952-82, amongst others.

=== Video Collaborations with Steve Reich ===
Two video/music collaborations with Steve Reich (The Cave, 1993, and Three Tales, 2002) brought video installation art into a theatrical context and have been performed worldwide since 1993 to the present (2023). Apart from performances, the works have been installed at venues such as the Whitney Museum, the Carnegie Museum of Art, the Museo Nacional Centro de Arte Reina Sofia, the Kunsthalle Düsseldorf, and ZKM.

Korot and Reich both participated in a collaborative interview with writer Jonathan Cott. The article was titled "Modern Folk Tales and Ancient Stories: a Conversation with Beryl Korot and Steve Reich".

=== Current Work ===
Since 2003, she has been creating a new body of video and print work which was seen at Aldrich Contemporary Art Museum for the first time, in Beryl Korot: Text/Weave/Line, Video 1977-2010, and subsequently at Dartmouth College in Fall 2011, and at bitforms gallery in Spring 2012, among others.

Korot also authored a piece that explained the development of her many art and video installations and the thoughts behind them, entitled "Language as Still Life: From Video to Painting."

For her latest show at bitforms gallery, Rethinking Threads, Korot constructed a very primitive loom which allows her to use different materials to weave. She work with a computer and several other tools to generate the imagery, which gives her the "flexibility as to where to work, whether in a rental apartment far from home or in the studio.... In a sense the new work continues the thinking of the earlier work, and its relative portability, as it continues to engage the dialog between machine and hand." Korot previously said that the drawings for Text and Commentary were begun in a hotel room in Venice, Italy: "I was thinking of the times we live in and people on the move."

Korot's current practice continues her inquiry into the numerical basis of abstract patterns laid down on the grid by programmed threads. "The current works abandon fiber as thread and in a sense, the loom. Here my loom is linen adhesive tape stretched across a work table sticky side up. In order to weave one needs taut warp threads. My sliced warp threads on strong heavy paper are placed on that adhesive strip. Once you have that you can weave the weft with your hands which is what I have done here. The freedom in a sense comes from the infinite choices of sourced raw material via camera or digital online files imported into Photoshop and sent to a printer. That I’m printing on paper is one option."

=== Awards and recognition ===
She is a Guggenheim Fellow, a Montgomery Fellow from Dartmouth College with Steve Reich, and has received numerous grants for her work from the National Endowment for the Arts, New York State Council on the Arts, and most recently from Anonymous Was a Woman (2008).

=== Personal life ===
Korot has been married to composer Steve Reich since 1976. They have one son, Ezra Reich, born in 1978.

== Video Works ==
- Invision, Lost Lascaux Bull, Dishes, Berlin Bees, 20 mins., 1973/4.
- Dachau 1974, 4 channel video installation work, 23 mins., 1974/75.
- Text and Commentary, 5 channel video installation work with 5 weavings, pictographic notations, 5 drawings, 33 mins., 1976/77.
- The Cave, a video opera in 3 Acts, music by Steve Reich, 120 mins., (1993).
- Sarai, Abram’s Wife, 3 video screen, 3 channel work, 1990.
- Departure from Bikini, 2 minutes, silent, (1991)
- Three Tales, a video opera, music by Steve Reich, 64 mins., 2002.
- Hindenburg, music by Steve Reich, 4 mins., 1997.
- Yellow Water Taxi, 2 mins., 2003.
- Vermont Landscape, 4 mins., 2004.
- Pond Life, 5 mins., 2005.
- Babel: the 7 minute scroll, 7 minutes, 2006
- Florence, 10 1/2 minutes, 2008.
- Etty, 12 minutes, 2009/10.
- Weaver's Notation - Variations 1 and 2, digital embroideries, 2012.
