= Michael Shamberg =

American film producer

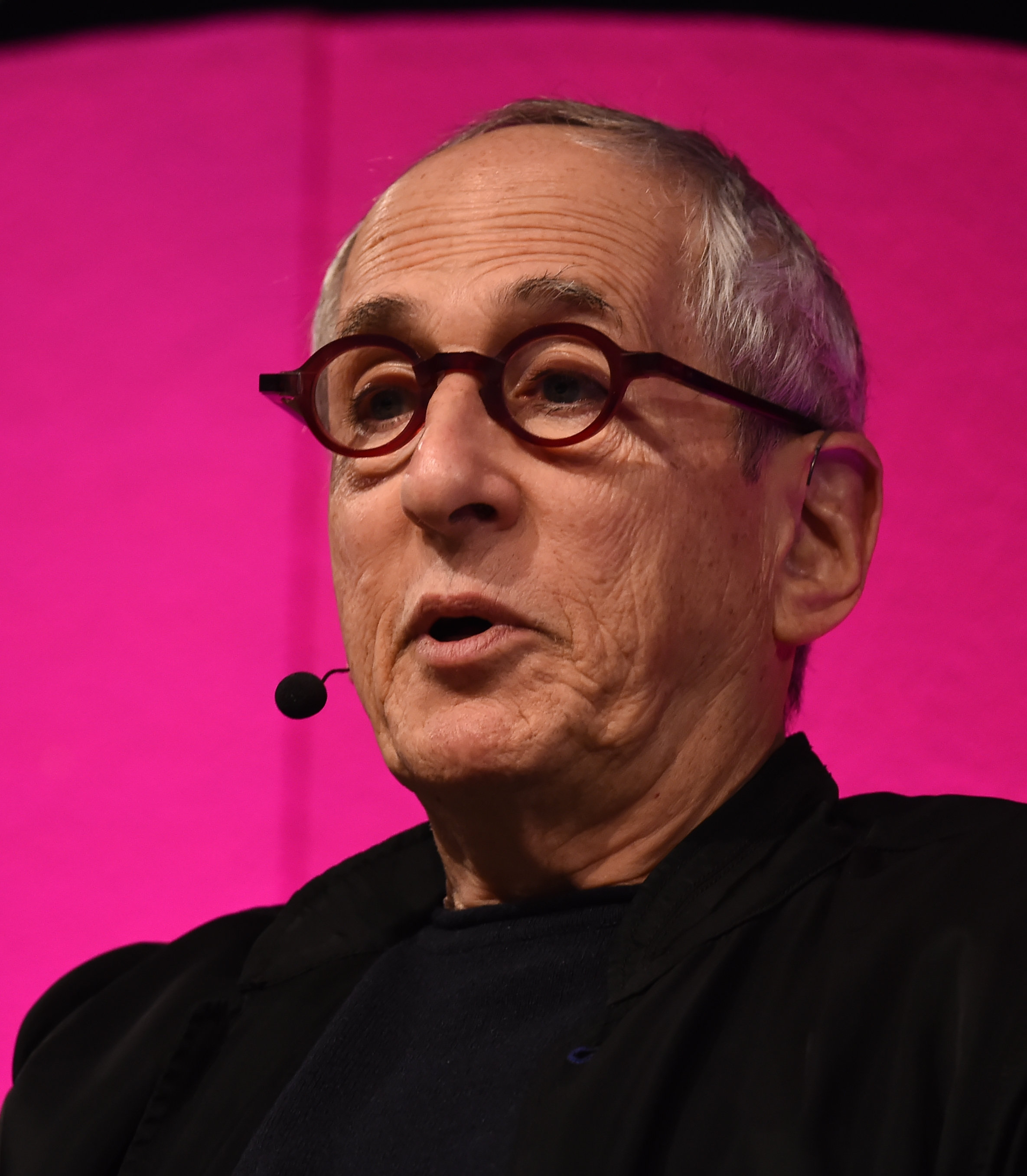
- Shamberg at Web Summit 2017
- Born: March 22, 1944 (age 82); Chicago, Illinois, U.S.
- Education: Washington University in St. Louis
- Occupations: Film producer, former Time–Life correspondent
- Spouses: Megan Williams (m. 1974; div. 1991) Carla Santos Shamberg (m. 1996)
- Children: 3

Michael Shamberg (born March 22, 1944) is an American film producer and former Time–Life correspondent.

== Life and career ==
His credits include Erin Brockovich, A Fish Called Wanda, Garden State, Gattaca, Pulp Fiction and The Big Chill. His production companies include Jersey Films, with Stacey Sher and Danny DeVito, and, as of 2015, Double Feature Films, with Stacey Sher.

In the 1960s and 1970s, counter-culture video collectives extended the role of the underground press to new communication technologies. In 1970, Shamberg co-founded a video collective called Raindance Corporation, which published a newspaper-magazine called Radical Software. Raindance Corporation later became TVTV, or Top Value Television. Shamberg and his first wife Megan Williams were founding members of TVTV. The collective believed new technology could effect social change. An example was Shamberg's work on In Hiding: A Conversation with Abbie Hoffman, broadcast on Public-access television station WNET/13 in May 1975.

Shamberg described his approach as "guerrilla television" (the title of his 1971 book) because, despite its strategies and tactics similar to warfare, guerrilla television is non-violent and he saw it as a means to break through the barriers imposed by broadcast television, which he called beast television.

His TVTV group's documentary Lord of the Universe, 1974, won a DuPont-Columbia Award in 1975. The group urged for the use of Sony's Portapak video camera, introduced in 1967, to be merged with the documentary film style and television, and later pioneer use of 3/4" video in their works.

Shamberg is a graduate of Washington University in St. Louis, where he became a brother of Zeta Beta Tau. Shamberg is Jewish.

== Filmography ==
He was a producer in all films unless otherwise noted.

=== Film ===
Year	Film	Credit
1980	Heart Beat	
1981	Modern Problems	
1983	The Big Chill	
1986	Club Paradise	
1988	A Fish Called Wanda	
1989	How I Got into College	
1994	Reality Bites	
1994	8 Seconds	
1994	Pulp Fiction	Executive producer
1995	Get Shorty	
1996	Sunset Park	
1996	Matilda	
1996	Feeling Minnesota	
1997	Fierce Creatures	
1997	Gattaca	
1998	Out of Sight	
1998	Living Out Loud	
1999	Man on the Moon	
2000	Drowning Mona	Executive producer
2000	Erin Brockovich	
2001	The Caveman's Valentine	
2001	How High	
2003	Camp	
2004	Along Came Polly	
2004	Garden State	Executive producer
2005	Be Cool	
2005	The Skeleton Key	
2006	World Trade Center	
2007	Freedom Writers	
2007	Reno 911!: Miami	
2010	Extraordinary Measures	
2011	Contagion	
2012	LOL	
2012	Django Unchained	Executive producer
2013	Runner Runner	
2014	Wish I Was Here	
2014	A Walk Among the Tombstones	
2015	Freeheld	
2015	Burnt	Executive producer
2016	Get a Job	
2017	Wetlands	Executive producer
2019	Cold Pursuit	

As an actor

Year	Film	Role
2000	Erin Brockovich	PG&E Lawyer
2004	Along Came Polly	Van Lew Executive
2010	Extraordinary Measures	Renzler Venture Capitalist #1

Thanks

Year	Film	Role
2002	The Good Girl	Special thanks
2018	A Futile and Stupid Gesture	Special thanks
2018	Super Troopers 2	Special thanks

=== Television ===
Year	Title	Credit	Notes
1972	Four More Years		Documentary
1974	Lord of the Universe		Documentary
1976	Super Bowl		Documentary
1976	TVTV Looks at the Academy Awards		Television special
1977	The TVTV Show		Television film
1998	The Pentagon Wars	Executive producer	Television film
2000	Celebrity	Executive producer	Television film
2001	Kate Brasher	Executive producer	
2002	The American Embassy	Executive producer	
2002	The Funkhousers	Executive producer	Television film
2001−02	UC: Undercover	Executive producer	
2003	Other People's Business	Executive producer	Television film
2003	Karen Sisco	Executive producer	
2015−19	Into the Badlands	Executive producer	
2004−20	Reno 911!	Executive producer	
2021	Reno 911!: The Hunt for QAnon	Executive producer	Television film
2022	Meltdown: Three Mile Island	Executive producer	Documentary
TBA	The Devil in the White City	Executive producer	

As an editor

Year	Title	Notes
1974	Lord of the Universe	Documentary
1976	Super Bowl	Documentary
1976	TVTV Looks at the Academy Awards	Television special

As writer

Year	Title	Notes
1977	The TVTV Show	Television film
