= The Trial of Lee Harvey Oswald =

The Trial of Lee Harvey Oswald refers to:

- The Trial of Lee Harvey Oswald (1964 film)
- The Trial of Lee Harvey Oswald (1977 film)
- The Trial of Lee Harvey Oswald (play)
