= Assassination of John F. Kennedy in popular culture =

The 1963 assassination of John F. Kennedy and the subsequent conspiracy theories surrounding it have been discussed, referenced, or recreated in popular culture numerous times.

== Literature ==
=== Novels ===
- Gideon's March (Hodder & Stoughton) by J. J. Marric, a novel published in 1962, the year before Kennedy's real life assassination, follows Inspector George Gideon learn of a plot to assassinate Kennedy during a state visit to London; the assassination is to take place during a parade, by means of a bomb, with the assassin, O'Hara, being a Southern bigot who hates Kennedy for his Roman Catholic faith and his civil rights initiatives.
- J. G. Ballard wrote a 1967 short-short story titled "The Assassination of John Fitzgerald Kennedy Considered as a Downhill Motor Race".
- The Illuminatus! Trilogy (1975) by Robert Shea and Robert Anton Wilson depicts the assassination scene, with several would-be assassins trying to kill Kennedy simultaneously.
- Sherlock Holmes in Dallas (Dodd, Mead, & Co. 1980) by Edmund Aubrey, brings the renowned consulting detective on the verge of his Sussex retirement to investigate the Kennedy assassination.
- Libra (1988) by Don DeLillo is a fictional imagining of the assassination, with Lee Harvey Oswald as the protagonist.
- The Underworld USA Trilogy (1995-2009) by James Ellroy, particularly the 1995 novel American Tabloid, constructs a fictional narrative involving several characters who have part in the Kennedy assassination.
- In Columbo: The Grassy Knoll (1994) by William Harrington, the titular lieutenant solves the Kennedy Assassination after a talk-show host is murdered before an exposé.
- The 1996 Doctor Who spin-off novel Who Killed Kennedy features the Doctor's enemy the Master attempting to kill Oswald before the assassination as Kennedy's survival would trigger a chain reaction in history that could wipe the Doctor from existence, requiring journalist James Stevens to go back in time and kill Kennedy himself (acting as both gunmen at different points in his life, as Oswald's rifle had a misaligned targeting scope that prevented him delivering the fatal shot from the Book Depository on the first trip). Coincidentally, the Doctor Who TV show started the day after the assassination with the first episode delayed by eighty seconds due to news coverage of the killing.
- The Star Spangled Contract (1976) by District Attorney Jim Garrison, and Captains and the Kings by Taylor Caldwell, are both based, in part, on a conspiratorial view of the Kennedy assassination.
- In The Amnesia Desk by Jim Sullivan, the son of Kennedy's 'real' killer - a CIA assassin - has to flee from the Amnesia Desk, a CIA clean-up team.
- Joshua, Son of None by Nancy Mars Freedman (1973, ISBN 9789995585228) is a novel about government officials secretly cloning Kennedy after assassination, and duplicating his actual life events by staging them in the new person's life. By controlling both nature and nurture, genetics and life events, the desired outcome results: the young man is successful, and is elected president.

=== Comic books ===
- In the first album of Jean van Hamme and William Vance's comic book series XIII, the title character is shown to be the alleged assassin of fictional U.S. President William B. Sheridan, who was murdered in his car during an official presidential visit to a city. The events are clearly based on JFK's assassination.
- In the Ultimate Marvel universe, Kennedy's true assassin is Red Skull, the son of Captain America. Nick Fury muses that the assassination of Kennedy was the Skull's way of showing that he would no longer take orders from America.
- In the 2008–2009 series The Umbrella Academy: Dallas by Gerard Way and Gabriel Bá, the Kennedy assassination is a central plot element. The series initially takes place in a timeline where the assassination never happened, until an organisation of time-travelling assassins go back to 1963 to kill Kennedy. When the Umbrella Academy intercept the gunmen, The Rumour, disguised as Jacqueline Kennedy, uses her powers to make Kennedy's head explode.
- In Superman: Red Son, Superman's space pod crash lands in the Soviet Union instead of the United States. Richard Nixon wins the 1960 Presidential Election, and he is the one who is assassinated in Dallas instead of Kennedy, who in this timeline marries Marilyn Monroe, and does not become president until the 1970s. He is later succeeded by Lex Luthor, who with Jimmy Olsen as his vice president, finally wins this extended version of the Cold War.
- In DC Comics' Crime Syndicate series, Kennedy is portrayed as a dictator who is killed by a teenage Ultraman.
- In DC Comics, Watchmen it is revealed that Comedian killed Kennedy.

== Alternative history ==
The assassination has been the subject of time travel and alternate history stories in science fiction film, television and literature, many with Kennedy or Oswald surviving or other people in the Presidential limousine dead. Some of these have Texas Governor John Connally or Jacqueline Kennedy killed in place of President Kennedy.

=== Literature ===
- In the 1980 novel Timescape by Gregory Benford, Kennedy's assassination was averted by a high school student who interrupted Lee Harvey Oswald at the Texas School Book Depository, attacking the shooter and sending the would-be fatal third shot awry. Although seriously injured, Kennedy survived. This interference created an alternate timeline in which William Scranton was the US president in 1974, having defeated Robert F. Kennedy due to a telephone tapping scandal.
- In the 1992 anthology Alternate Kennedys, edited by Mike Resnick, 25 science fiction authors imagine alternate histories involving the Kennedys, including speculating upon different outcomes of November 22, 1963.
- In the 1994 alternate history novel Bubba Ho-Tep and the 2002 film of the same name by Joe R. Lansdale, one of the main characters is an African-American man who claims that he is John F. Kennedy and that following his failed assassination attempt, his death was faked, his skin was dyed black and was abandoned by Lyndon B. Johnson in that same nursing home Elvis Presley was staying in.
- In Stephen Baxter's novel Voyage (1996), the Dallas assassination attempt only succeeds in crippling Kennedy, but Jacqueline Bouvier Kennedy is killed. Kennedy is re-elected in 1964 and commits the United States to landing a crewed vessel on Mars, which occurs in 1986. The novel uses the assassination attempt only as the impetus for an alternate history US space program.
- In Michael Chabon's 2007 alternative history novel The Yiddish Policemen's Union it is mentioned that Kennedy was never assassinated and married Marilyn Monroe.
- Jeff Golden's 2008 novel Unafraid: A Novel of the Possible speculates on what would have happened had the assassination attempt been unsuccessful, with Kennedy serving two full terms as president. (ISBN 0595471927) Lee Harvey Oswald's rifle jams during the assassination attempt, leaving Kennedy wounded and Governor Connally dead.
- In the 2010 book, TimeRiders, a training mission involves going back to November 22, 1963, to stop Lee Harvey Oswald from killing JFK. This results in a new timeline in which a large space program sends a mission to Mars on September 10, 2001. The trainees learn that history corrects itself, and Oswald, who was originally a lone gunman, was no longer alone when he shot the President but was part of a conspiracy, thanks to their interference with the timestream.
- Stephen King's novel 11/22/63, published in 2011, tells about a time traveler trying to stop the assassination. The novel was adapted into a TV series, 11.22.63, in 2016. In both versions, the protagonist succeeds in saving Kennedy and kills Oswald with his own rifle in the Texas Schoolbook Depository after distracting him on the day of the would-be assassination after Oswald fired the first shot at the motorcade, but returns to a dystopian future brought about by his actions (as stopping the assassination later allowed George Wallace to win the 1968 election and start a nuclear war), prompting him to return to the past to "reset" the results of his intervention. The protagonist also attempts to prove Oswald was assisted by a Soviet agent when he attempted to kill Kennedy and General Edwin Walker.
- In the 2012 book The Man from 2063 by Jack Duffy, a lawyer travels back in time prior to November 22, 1963, to prevent the assassination. Unlike Stephen King's novel which has Lee Harvey Oswald acting alone to kill JFK, The Man from 2063 portrays the assassination as a conspiracy.
- In the Space: 1999 graphic novel, Aftershock and Awe (2013), the events of the television series are set within an alternate history. That history diverged from our own when Kennedy escaped assassination by visiting Cape Canaveral instead of Dallas. His survival led to an accelerated space race and diminished Cold War tensions, although a limited nuclear exchange occurred between the United States and North Korea in 1987. During the 1970s, when the TV show was made, 1999 was the future. Placing the show in an alternate timeline allows the graphic novel to ignore the events of real life history as the series has spacefaring technology advanced beyond that of the real 1999 (or indeed the late 2010s).
- In Ken Davenport's 2017 novel The Two Gates, Kennedy survives the Dallas shooting with the back-to-throat wound he actually received, but First Lady Jackie is killed by the fatal third shot. The novel deals with speculation as to how Kennedy would have dealt with the Vietnam War had he lived.
- In the SCP Foundation collaborative writing project, the assassination of Kennedy is featured in the 2017 short story SCP-3780 - Who Shot JFK?. SCP-3780 is a series of attempts by time travelers to prevent the assassination of John F. Kennedy by Lee Harvey Oswald. The Temporal Anomalies Department, a division of the SCP Foundation, is tasked with intercepting the attempts to assure or reinstate the proper series of historical events. SCP-3780 - Who Shot JFK? was inspired by the amount of conspiracy theories and the release of the assassination files by order of President Donald Trump.

=== In film ===
A pair of alternate history films called The Trial of Lee Harvey Oswald made in 1964 and 1977 have the accused assassin not being killed by Jack Ruby and standing trial for the murder of President Kennedy. Neither film ends in a verdict: the earlier movie ends after jury instructions, imploring viewers to debate among themselves; while the latter one has him being shot to death while being escorted from his jail cell to the courtroom just after the jury came back from deliberating.

- The 1990 TV movie, Running Against Time, depicts a contemporary schoolteacher who laments the death of his brother in Vietnam, going back in time to prevent the assassination, based on the belief that it would prevent Lyndon Johnson from beginning an escalation of the conflict. His attempt results in him being accused of the crime. The film is based on the 1986 Stanley Shapiro book A Time to Remember.
- In the 2000 film Timequest, a time-traveler prevents Kennedy's assassination and history takes an alternate course, including the birth of a second son, James Kennedy, who was conceived on the night of November 22, 1963, when Kennedy and his wife return from Dallas. It also has Robert F. Kennedy becoming president in the late 1970s, with Martin Luther King Jr. as his vice president, after both men were saved from their assassinations in 1968 by the same time traveler. The film depicts a conspiracy by having Clint Hill shooting two would-be assassins at the grassy knoll and later Jack Ruby to prevent him from killing Oswald.

=== In television ===
- "Lee Harvey Oswald", the 1992 season opener for the TV series Quantum Leap, finds Sam Beckett leaping into Oswald's body, but various glitches in the Leaping system result in Beckett's mind becoming 'mixed-up' with Oswald's, to the extent that Beckett starts acting like Oswald as he leaps through Oswald's life and gets closer and closer to the date of the assassination. At a critical moment, Al Calavicci prompts him to leap into Secret Service Agent Clint Hill. Hill attempts to reach the President's car before the shots are fired, but he fails to prevent Kennedy's death. Calavicci later reveals that he and Beckett have saved one life – that of Jackie Kennedy, whom Oswald had killed along with the President in the original timeline. This episode was written by series creator Donald P. Bellisario, in response to the Oliver Stone film JFK. Bellisario, who served with Oswald in the Marine Corps, does not believe in a conspiracy; he used supporting evidence from the Warren Commission Report and his own experience with Oswald, and had Calavicci speculate that people find it comfortable to believe in a conspiracy, reasoning that if any one person can kill the President of the United States, then nobody is safe.
- In the Red Dwarf 1997 episode "Tikka to Ride", the characters accidentally knock Lee Harvey Oswald out of the fifth-floor window of the Book Depository when they travel back in time to 1963 by mistake, creating an alternate timeline where Kennedy is impeached in 1965 for sharing a mistress with a mafia boss. Jumping forward in time to 1966, the crew learn that, due to Kennedy's impeachment, J. Edgar Hoover was blackmailed into running for president by the mob and allows Russia to establish nuclear missiles in Cuba, while Kennedy's impeachment traumatised the nation and allowed the USSR to win the space race while the southern states flee due to the fear of missiles from Cuba. Fearing the repercussions of this timeline, the crew go back to 1963 and redirect Oswald up to the sixth floor before their past selves can kill him, but realise that at that angle Oswald's trajectory is now too steep for him to do more than wound Kennedy. Unwilling to kill Kennedy themselves, the characters travel to 1965 and convince the alternate John F. Kennedy to go back in time and shoot his past self from the grassy knoll, arguing that this action will restore his historical position as a liberal icon. "Timeslides", an earlier episode of Red Dwarf, also jokingly mentions the possibility of preventing the assassination.
- In American Heroes Channel's What if? Armageddon 1962, Richard Pavlick succeeds in assassinating President-elect Kennedy, and Lyndon Johnson is sworn in on January 20, 1961. While the Bay of Pigs invasion goes as it historically did, the Cuban Missile Crisis is different. Having more confidence in his military advisers than Kennedy did, Johnson authorizes military air strikes to take out the missile sites. However, some missiles were hidden from sight and the United States, Cuba and the Soviet Union engage in a nuclear war.
- In a 2018 episode of the TV series Timeless, a young Kennedy is transported to 2018, and before he can be returned to 1934, he is warned not to go to Dallas in 1963. When the time travelers return to 2018, they are told he was killed in Austin, Texas after two years as president.
- In 2021, the 2nd episode of the 1st season of the Netflix series Inside Job, an old man known as Grassy Noel Atkinson is credited as the Kennedy's assassin and later helps to kill the mutated JFK clones that are trying to escape the Cognito Inc. facilities in DC. Later, in 17th episode of the 2nd season, when a spacetime-altering machine is activated several times, one of the changes in history is that Kennedy was never assassinated, which leads to an unknown alternate history event where he "killed millions".

=== In video games ===
- Reelect JFK, in which Kennedy is a playable character, set in an alternative timeline, where he survives his assassination attempt, and attempts to seek reelection in 1964, while confronting key political issues such as Vietnam and the Civil Rights Movement, and discovering who was responsible for the assassination attempt on his life.
- In 2017 video game Prey, the attempt on the life of John F. Kennedy failed, allowing him to complete his presidency and continue the United States' collaboration with the Soviet Union on the Klekta project, with the former eventually taking full control of it themselves. In this timeline, Kennedy lives up to the age of 114.
- The 2024 video game Dustborn depicts an alternate reality in which Jackie Kennedy was accidentally assassinated instead of John F. Kennedy. John then marries Marilyn Monroe and creates a nationwide police force called Justice, which ends up causing America to be fractured into a multi-sectored Republic by the end of the 20th Century. Robotics are also prioritized.

== Film, television, and stage ==
=== Film ===
- The Trial of Lee Harvey Oswald, 1964 film
- Four Days in November, a 1964 documentary film directed by Mel Stuart.
- The 1966 Emile de Antonio documentary Rush to Judgment, based on Mark Lane's 1966 book of the same name, shows Lane interviewing witnesses who claim the shots came from the grassy knoll instead of the Texas School Book Depository.
- Andy Warhol's 1966 film Since recreated the assassination from multiple perspectives with participants from The Factory. Since is heavily improvised and explores the media portrayal of the assassination.
- Tonino Valerii's 1969 Spaghetti Western film The Price of Power, starring Giuliano Gemma and Van Johnson, was the first filmed drama to present a critical perspective on the Kennedy assassination; although it dramatises the assassination of James A. Garfield, it reflects the events and conspiracy theories surrounding Kennedy's death.
- David Miller's 1973 film Executive Action is the first conspiracy theory-based Hollywood-made dramatization of the Kennedy assassination.
- The Trial of Lee Harvey Oswald, 1977 film
- The 1978 made-for-television movie, Ruby and Oswald, generally followed the official record as presented by the Warren Commission of the actions of Lee Harvey Oswald and Jack Ruby on the weekend of the assassination.
- French director Henri Verneuil's 1979 movie I as in Icarus (the story is based in a fictional country with fictional characters but the events are clearly linked with the assassination of John F. Kennedy, including amateur footage similar to the Zapruder film)
- In the 1984 movie Flashpoint, a United States Border Patrol agent finds a car containing the body of a man he believed participated in a conspiracy to kill President Kennedy and was murdered and robbed of the money he received for doing so.
- In the 1987 Stanley Kubrick movie Full Metal Jacket the Marines discuss Oswald. Gunnery Sergeant Hartman comments "Oswald got off three rounds with an old Italian bolt action rifle in only six seconds and scored two hits, including a head shot! Do any of you people know where (Oswald) learned to shoot?" (In the Marines)
- The 1990 film Captain America credits the Red Skull and his organization with Kennedy's and his brother Robert's assassinations.
- Oliver Stone's 1991 dramatic film JFK, based in part upon the book On the Trail of the Assassins by former Orleans Parish (Louisiana) District Attorney Jim Garrison, who unsuccessfully prosecuted Clay Shaw for conspiracy relating to the assassination in 1969.
- The 1992 drama film Love Field features Michelle Pfeiffer as Lurene Hallett, a Dallas hairdresser, attempting to travel to Washington to attend John F. Kennedy's funeral. Though the movie encompasses other issues besides the assassination, it portrays one facet of the public reaction to the event.
- The 1992 film Ruby is an exploration of certain conspiracy theories surrounding the JFK assassination from Jack Ruby's perspective.
- The 1993 thriller film In the Line of Fire, starring Clint Eastwood, hinges around the JFK assassination. Set in present-day 1993, the film is about a psychopath who plans to assassinate the current President of the United States. Eastwood's character is Secret Service agent Frank Horrigan, the last remaining active agent who was on duty in November 1963, guarding Kennedy in Dallas. Horrigan is consumed with guilt over his failure to react quickly enough to the first shot in Dallas, and becomes obsessed with defeating a young man who has resolved to become a new assassin on the same level as Lee Harvey Oswald or John Wilkes Booth.
- The 1993 TV movie Fatal Deception: Mrs. Lee Harvey Oswald is a biopic about Marina Oswald Porter, the widow of Lee Harvey Oswald.
- The 1997 comedic short film My Dinner with Oswald, directed by Paul Duane, focuses on a re-creation of the assassination at a Dublin dinner party.
- The 1997 dark-comedy dramatic film The House of Yes stars Parker Posey and Josh Hamilton as twins Jacqueline, nicknamed "Jackie-O", and Marty. She has the same old mental health issues and he brings home a new fiancée for Thanksgiving. Mayhem ensues including adding incest to their favorite childhood "game" of obsessively re-enacting the John F. Kennedy assassination.
- The 2002 comedy horror film Bubba Ho-tep (based on the 1994 novella of the same name) features Ossie Davis playing an assassination-obsessed character who claims he is Kennedy. He has a scale model of Dealey Plaza and photos of the various suspects on his wall. He also claims that after he recovered from the assassination attempt, his skin was dyed black and was abandoned by Lyndon B. Johnson in a nursing home.
- The 2002 mockumentary film Interview with the Assassin presents the assassination and resultant conspiracy theories with a terminally ill former Marine named Walter Ohlinger who claims that he was the second gunman behind the fence on the grassy knoll and was paid by unidentified government agents for doing so, who are now attempting to silence him for exposing the truth. His ex-wife then tells the interviewer he was also mentally ill and was nowhere near Dallas on the day of the assassination.
- Kennedy's assassination is briefly referenced, in the 2007 Disney film National Treasure: Book of Secrets. The title refers to a book supposedly written and maintained by every American President, containing hidden knowledge from U.S. history. Upon being found, a brief section of the book contains photos and handwritten notes, hinting at a government conspiracy.
- The 2007 film Shooter, features Levon Helm's character Mr. Rate talking to Mark Wahlberg and Michael Peña about conspiracies. He tells them, "Them boys on the grassy knoll, they were dead within three hours. Buried in the damn desert, unmarked graves out past Terlingua". When asked how he knows this, he replies, "Still got the shovel!"
- Zack Snyder's 2009 movie Watchmen, based on the 1986–87 DC Comics limited series of the same name by Alan Moore and Dave Gibbons, during the opening credits sequence portrays The Comedian, one of the members of the Watchmen, as Kennedy's assassin; he is shown firing the fatal headshot from the grassy knoll behind Abraham Zapruder.
- The 2013 docudrama Parkland follows the actions of several people closely related to the assassination from November 22–25, 1963, including the Presidential limousine, the staff of Parkland Memorial Hospital's trauma room, the Secret Service and FBI agents, Abraham Zapruder, and Lee Harvey Oswald's family.
- The 2013 TV movie Killing Kennedy, an adaptation of the Bill O'Reilly and Martin Dugard book Killing Kennedy: The End of Camelot, dramatizes the presidency and assassination of Kennedy, as well as the life of Lee Harvey Oswald in the years leading up to the assassination.
- In the 2013 movie The Bystander Theory, a woman discovers her late grandmother was the Babushka Lady and finds her film of the assassination, which purportedly also shows a second gunman on the grassy knoll. Her failure to come forward with her film was explained by her husband accidentally killing her and secretly burying her body with the film after the murder of President Kennedy, thinking she was having an affair.
- In the 2014 Marvel Cinematic Universe film, Captain America: The Winter Soldier the titular assassin is revealed to have killed Kennedy on the orders of Hydra.
- The 2014 movie X-Men: Days of Future Past featured some scenes set in 1973 which reveal that Magneto has been in prison beneath the Pentagon since 1963 for his apparent role in the Kennedy assassination. Magneto maintains his innocence by claiming he was trying to save Kennedy's life because he claims that Kennedy was one of their kind, but his efforts were interrupted by the police who arrested him, causing the bullet to curve in midflight.
- The 2016 film Jackie follows the aftermath of the assassination from Jacqueline Kennedy's (played by Natalie Portman) perspective.
- In the 2016 film The Umbrella Man, set in 1983, a father grieving the death of his son who was killed in a hunting accident becomes obsessed with the assassination and derives a theory that Louie Witt was the second shooter in Dallas and was urged to do so by the Mafia.
- In 2021, Oliver Stone directed the documentary film JFK Revisited: Through the Looking Glass.
- The 2026 film November 1963, directed by Roland Joffé.
- In the 2026 film Wild Horse Nine dying CIA agent Chris Carlisle, played by John Malkovich is revealed to possess the rifle that killed Kennedy, used in the climax to kill the antagonists, as well as a second 8mm film of the assasination "...from the front." provided as leverage against the CIA.

=== Television ===
- The 1983 NBC TV mini series Kennedy, which focuses on the Kennedy Presidency, showed the assassination in graphic detail.
- The 1986 Twilight Zone episode "Profile in Silver" depicts a time traveler who is a descendant of Kennedy, attends and accidentally meddles in the timeline continuum.
- Nigel Turner's 1988, 1991, 1995 and 2003 continuing documentary The Men Who Killed Kennedy explores conspiracy theories of the assassination.
- The 1991 TV mini-series A Woman Named Jackie showed the assassination from Jackie Kennedy's perspective.
- Seinfeld: The 1992 episode "The Boyfriend" featured a pastiche of assassination featuring the "single bullet theory" made famous in JFK and an essential part of the assassination. In the episode, Kramer and Newman accuse former Mets player Keith Hernandez of spitting on them following a 1988 loss at home. Jerry concurs that must also have been a "second spitter", but they likely will never know the full truth.
- In the season 1 finale of Babylon 5 (1994), the swearing in of president Clark replicates the scenery and circumstances of the swearing in of Lyndon B. Johnson on Air Force one.
- The X-Files episode "Musings of a Cigarette Smoking Man" (1996) places a young cigarette smoking man as the assassin, shooting from a sewer drain located near the grassy knoll after setting up Oswald as his patsy. He also assassinates Martin Luther King Jr. while framing James Earl Ray in the episode.
- The two-part 1997 Early Edition episode "The Wall" has Gary Hobson involved in trying to prevent a presidential assassination plot that bears much resemblance to President Kennedy's assassination. During the course of the episode, Gary (who receives tomorrow's newspaper today) finds information about the murder of JFK that has a tie to the current day plot he is trying to stop through finding a copy of the November 23, 1963 newspaper that belonged to his predecessor.
- In The Simpsons episode "Mayored to the Mob", the character Leavelle who trains Homer Simpson at "Leavelle's Bodyguard Academy," is based on Texan detective Jim Leavelle, as he appeared when escorting Lee Harvey Oswald when Oswald was shot by Jack Ruby. Leavelle trains the bodyguards by pretending to shoot their protectee from a grassy knoll on a cart. This is a reference to the grassy knoll at the site of President John F. Kennedy's assassination, Dealey Plaza and a scene from the Kennedy assassination film Executive Action (1973). In the episode "Diatribe of a Mad Housewife", Homer and Marge Simpson decide to make their own novel: "Who Really Killed JFK", with Homer's theory being that Lee Harvey Oswald wanted to steal "the Jack Ruby", but then refutes his own idea when Marge tells him that Jack Ruby was a man, not a jewel.
- JFK: 3 Shots That Changed America - historical documentary about the assassination of President John F. Kennedy
- The 2009 Mad Men episode "The Grown-Ups" focused on the characters' reaction to JFK's assassination and the subsequent events in their personal lives.
- The 2010 Bones episode "The Proof in the Pudding" has the characters being forced by the Secret Service to identify cause of death on a highly classified skeleton they later identify as JFK. They determine that JFK was shot twice in the head from two different angles suggesting a second shooter. At one point Booth recreates the assassination in the lab, using a watermelon on a remote controlled car to establish essentially a scale model of the crime, with Hodgins observing that Booth's ability to make the shot doesn't prove anything as Oswald was in much worse physical condition than Booth and would have had more trouble making such a shot. The idea of a conspiracy causes Booth to question his trust in the government until Bones performs another test that determines this skeleton suffered from a bone disorder JFK did not suffer from, meaning this was not JFK. After the skeleton was returned Bones admits in private that JFK had Scarlet Fever as a child and that could have created a false-positive on her test but they were all better off not knowing for certain if that really was JFK.
- "The Suspicious Assassination of JFK", released September 29, 2017, was episode 10 of season 2 of BuzzFeed web series, BuzzFeed Unsolved: True Crime in which the various theories surrounding the assassination were discussed.
- The second season of the Netflix series The Umbrella Academy, based on the comic book of the same name and released in 2020, is centered around the assassination of JFK, which time travelling protagonists have to investigate to prevent a nuclear war. In the series the assassination is carried out on the orders of shadow government, members of which see Kennedy as an obstacle to their plans.
- In the 2023 South Park episode "Japanese Toilet," there are references and spoofs to the Oliver Stone film JFK, only it talks about a conspiracy of the toilet paper industry involved in debunking the rising Japanese toilet market in maintaining its monopoly to the bench scene between Jimmy who confesses to Stan after he wrote a story about toilets for the school newspaper, the industry silenced him because they have too much to lose if Americans stop using toilet paper, much like the walk taken by Jim Garrison (Kevin Costner) and "X" (Donald Sutherland) in Washington, D.C.

=== Stage productions ===
- The 1967 satirical play MacBird! by Barbara Garson superimposes the events of the assassination on the general plot structure of Shakespeare's Macbeth, with Kennedy becoming murdered king "Ken O'Dunc" and Lyndon Johnson the treacherous title character. The mockery of the play's name is derived from Johnson's propensity to refer to his wife Claudia as "Lady Bird" and his elder daughter as "Lynda Bird." Garson insisted that her play was a satire and not intended to suggest seriously that Johnson had had a hand in the assassination.
- In 1975, a San Francisco-based group of artists called Ant Farm reenacted the Kennedy assassination in Dealey Plaza, and documented it in a video called The Eternal Frame.
- The 1990 Broadway musical Assassins, written by Stephen Sondheim and John Weidman, climaxes as the ghosts of John Wilkes Booth, Leon Czolgosz, Charles Guiteau, and other "would be" assassins including John Hinckley, appear before a suicidally depressed Lee Harvey Oswald, and convince him that the only way for him to truly connect with his country is to share his pain and disillusionment with it.

== Music ==
- The Byrds included a version of "He Was a Friend of Mine" on their 1965 album Turn! Turn! Turn!, the lyrics of which were reworded by Jim McGuinn into a lament for Kennedy.
- In 1965, Jugoton released a 17 minute long recording of the epic poem "Smrt u Dalasu" (Death in Dallas) sung by Jozo Karamatić, Croatian guslar from Herzegovina. The lyrics were written by Božo Lasić.
- The 1968 Dion song "Abraham, Martin and John" references both John and brother Robert's assassinations.
- The 1968 Rolling Stones song "Sympathy for the Devil" references both John and brother Robert's assassinations with the lyric, "I shouted out / Who killed the Kennedys? / When after all / It was you and me."
- Allen Ginsberg's 1975 poem Hadda Be Playing on the Jukebox references the Kennedy assassination and the supposed involvement of the Mafia and the CIA, saying "Kennedy stretched and smiled and got double-crossed by lowlife goons and agents".
- The 1978 Misfits single "Bullet" describes the events around the assassination, stating that "Texas is the reason" for his death in lyrics directed towards Jacqueline Kennedy, in addition to sexual demands.
- The English rock duo Godley & Creme song "Lonnie" is the 7th track on the 1980 album Ismism featuring lyrics about a man named Lonnie Garamond who kills Kennedy with a camera gun.
- The British Heavy Metal band Saxon released the track Dallas 1 p.m. on their 1980 album Strong Arm of the Law. The track has remained a staple song in Saxon's set list up until the 2020s.
- The Human League song "Seconds" from their 1981 album Dare deals directly with the Kennedy assassination and is directed at Lee Harvey Oswald. When playing live, the group regularly projected slides onto the background of the stage, and would play this song in front of images of Kennedy and the assassination in Dallas.
- "The Day John Kennedy Died" is a track on Lou Reed's 1982 album The Blue Mask.
- Paul Simon's 1983 song "The Late Great Johnny Ace" references Kennedy's assassination among other famous deaths.
- Kris Kristofferson's 1986 song "They Killed Him" references Kennedy and his brother, as well as Mahatma Gandhi, Martin Luther King Jr., and Jesus Christ as slain martyrs.
- The Was (Not Was) songs "11 Miles An Hour" and "11 MPH (Abe Zapp Ruder Version)" on respective International and US-Japan releases of their 1988 album What Up, Dog? is about the JFK assassination and the speed the car was going, as well as referencing Abraham Zapruder and the Zapruder film of the event.
- Billy Joel's song "We Didn't Start the Fire" mentions the JFK assassination in the lyrics "JFK blown away what else do I have to say?!".
- The music video for "The Ballad of Peter Pumpkinhead" by Alternative Rock group XTC on their 1992 album Nonsuch reenacts some events of the day of Kennedy's assassination drawing parallels with the death of Jesus Christ.
- The 1998 Steve Gillette song "Two Men in the Building" on his album Texas & Tennessee is mostly about the assassination, in fact presenting Steve's own theory about it. Steve is a well-known songwriter, best known as the co-writer of the song Darcy Farrow.
- The 1999 music video "Coma White" on the 1998 album Mechanical Animals by American gothic rock band Marilyn Manson shows a darker bloodless representation of the Assassination of John F. Kennedy, including his then-fiancée Rose McGowan as Jacqueline Kennedy. Furthermore, their 2000 album Holy Wood (In the Shadow of the Valley of Death) by Marilyn Manson contains numerous references to the Kennedy assassination.
- The 2012 music video "National Anthem" by singer-songwriter Lana Del Rey depicts her as Marilyn Monroe and Jacqueline Kennedy and shows re-enactments of home videos with ASAP Rocky as John F. Kennedy and re-enacting the assassination of the president.
- Bob Dylan's song "Murder Most Foul" (2020) is an extended meditation on Kennedy's assassination and its meaning in American culture.

== Games ==
- The card game Chrononauts, which simulates the cause-and-effects of changing history through time-travel, features Kennedy's assassination as a Linchpin card. When flipped (and Kennedy is injured rather than killed), it affects three later Ripple Points: the assassinations of Robert F. Kennedy and Martin Luther King Jr. (1968), the Apollo 11 Moon landing (1969), and Richard Nixon's resignation (1974).
- The 2004 video game JFK Reloaded puts the player in the role of Lee Harvey Oswald, where the player is then scored on how closely one's version of the assassination matches the report of the Warren Commission: first shot missed, second hit JFK and Governor Connally and third on JFK's head. According to the company, the primary aim of the game was "to establish the most likely facts of what happened on 1963-11-22 by running the world's first mass-participation forensic construction", the theory being that a player could help prove that Lee Harvey Oswald had the "means and the opportunity to commit the crime", and thus help prove the Warren Commission's findings.
- The 2010 video game Call of Duty: Black Ops gives hints that the main player character Alex Mason (Sam Worthington) is brainwashed by the Soviet Union into assassinating Kennedy within the context of the video game. An ending cutscene shows Mason was in the crowd of onlookers who watched Kennedy disembark from Air Force One in Lovefield.
- In the post-credits scene of the 2016 video game Mafia III, Lincoln Clay's former CIA handler in Vietnam and Lincoln's intelligence provider in order to take down the Marcano Crime Family, John Donovan, has been invited to a Senate Committee hearing in 1971 to testify his participation in Lincoln's revenge against the Marcanos, Donovan explains that he helped Lincoln was due to evidence that he uncovered that Sal, the boss of the Marcano Crime family, has been one of the conspirators of the assassination of Kennedy, and further evidence states that one of the senators presiding over the hearing as another conspirator, Donovan then later pulls his silenced pistol and kills the senator, stating that he will hunt down those responsible for the death of Kennedy.

== See also ==
- Assassinations in fiction
- Cultural depictions of John F. Kennedy
- Cultural depictions of Jacqueline Kennedy Onassis
- Robert F. Kennedy in media
- Assassination of Robert F. Kennedy
- Assassination of Martin Luther King Jr.
