= JFK Reloaded =

2004 video game

- Developer: Traffic Games
- Publisher: Traffic Games
- Director: Kirk Ewing
- Platform: Windows
- Release: November 22, 2004
- Genre: First-person shooter
- Mode: Single-player

JFK Reloaded is a 2004 first-person shooter game developed and published by Traffic Games. It simulates the 1963 assassination of John F. Kennedy according to the report of the Warren Commission. The player, controlling Lee Harvey Oswald, is tasked with recreating the three shots fired during the assassination and gains higher scores the more accurately they line up with the report. Shots can be reviewed in slow motion and from multiple viewpoints.

Kirk Ewing, the founder of Traffic Games, envisioned a small-scale simulation of a historical event after leaving VIS Entertainment. He chose Kennedy's assassination over the Apollo 11 Moon landing in part due to the high amount of public domain information available on the former. A team of ten people worked with the game engine of Carmageddon to accurately recreate the event, taking several months each for research and development. Released on November 22, 2004, the 41st anniversary of the assassination, JFK Reloaded was denounced by public figures, including a spokesman for Kennedy's brother Ted.

== Gameplay ==
The player aiming at John F. Kennedy through their scope

JFK Reloaded is a first-person shooter. It recreates the assassination of John F. Kennedy, the 35th president of the United States, as it occurred on November 22, 1963, according to the report of the Warren Commission. The player controls Lee Harvey Oswald from the sixth-floor window of the Texas School Book Depository in Dallas. As Kennedy's presidential limousine passes through Dealey Plaza, the player has to take three shots at the president with a sniper rifle. They gain points based on how closely these shots match the Warren Commission's report: The first has to miss the car, the second hit Kennedy in the neck and John Connally (the governor of Texas) in the chest, and the third fatally wound Kennedy in the head. The perfect score is 1,000. While the game does not prevent the player from pursuing alternative scenarios, points are deducted when the player deviates from the event, such as by hitting Jacqueline Kennedy, the first lady.

JFK Reloaded includes a "Chaos Meter" that controls how heavily the motorcade's drivers are affected by panic. Following each game, individual shots can be replayed in slow motion and with a close-up of each bullet. The scene can be viewed from several angles, including from the grassy knoll, the location of the Zapruder film, and a virtual camera mounted to Kennedy's limousine. The player can further enable blood splatter effects and exaggerated physics.

== Development and release ==
JFK Reloaded was developed by Traffic Management Limited (trade name: Traffic Games), a company based in Stirling, Scotland. The company's founder and managing director, Kirk Ewing, had a background in producing documentaries for Channel 4. In the video game industry, he had previously worked for VIS Entertainment as the creative director for Earthworm Jim 3D (1999) and State of Emergency (2002). The latter was denounced for similarities to the 1999 Seattle WTO protests, despite not being inspired by them. Having worked on projects as large as State of Emergency, Ewing wanted to focus on smaller ventures. In establishing Traffic Games, he intended to create a game based on a historical event and initially considered modeling one after the Apollo 11 Moon landing. Ewing later settled on the assassination of Kennedy because there was a high amount of public domain information documenting the event. He also noted that ballistics simulations were a staple of video games and that many other forms of media had already covered the incident.

Ewing sought help from a friend at Stainless Games, the developer of Carmageddon. The friend was fond of the game idea and provided Traffic Games with Carmageddon's game engine. Therein, the JFK Reloaded development team reconstructed the site of Kennedy's assassination with accurate object placements and appropriate weather conditions. According to Ewing, one aim of the development was to disprove conspiracy theories surrounding the assassination by demonstrating that Oswald would have been capable of carrying out the shooting alone under the conditions of that day. The ten-person development team, composed of former developers of State of Emergency, Grand Theft Auto, and Killzone, took several months to research the matter, (Note: The time used for research was reported as both seven and ten months.) followed by six months of producing the game.

Before the game's release, Ewing sent a letter to Ted Kennedy (John F. Kennedy's brother and a United States senator for Massachusetts), who was informed of the game on November 19, 2004. Traffic Games announced JFK Reloaded on November 21 and released it on November 22, the 41st anniversary of the assassination. It was the company's first release. Traffic Games distributed the game commercially alongside a free demo via the game's website. The site was set to remain available for three months. To boost the game's commercial performance, the company held a month-long competition for players to replicate the shooting as accurately as possible. The reward was a cash prize of up to $100,000, depending on the game's revenue. "Major_Koenig", a 16-year-old boy from Paris, won with a score of 782 and received $10,712.

== Reception ==
JFK Reloaded was subject to controversy, being denounced by several public figures: David Smith, a spokesman for Ted Kennedy, stated simply that "It's despicable." Senator Joe Lieberman was "sickened" by the game, according to his spokesman Casey Aden-Wansbury. The politician John Kasich discussed the game in his book Stand for Something: The Battle for America's Soul in a segment about graphic content in mainstream video games: "I'm telling you, despicable doesn't even begin to describe some of these things." The Massachusetts House of Representatives passed a resolution condemning it. The presidential historian G. Calvin Mackenzie considered JFK Reloaded to be "in incredibly bad taste" and noted that "marketing it as an educational tool seems to stretch the notion of education beyond belief". The game was attacked by members of the public online, on television, and in print media. Ewing claimed to have received death threats. He responded that the controversy was "understandable given the fact that many people were alive at that time and still have vivid memories of the event" but stated that JFK Reloaded neither condoned nor glorified the event. In retrospect, Ewing said he regretted tying a cash prize to killing Kennedy, saying that he had been "naïve" and had "underestimated the depth of affection for Kennedy held by many American people".

Slate's Clive Thompson lauded JFK Reloaded for its realistic bullet physics and labeled it a "remarkable" physics simulation. However, he stated that the game was a "nauseating" experience because it had the player shoot and kill real people, some of whom still had living relatives, unlike other games. He further felt that JFK Reloaded did not aim to provoke the catharsis that other works of art brought about. Jefferson Morley, in his editorial for Salon, cited an "undeniable appeal" to the game's re-enactment of the assassination and the "antisocial pleasure" he associated with it. He cited the ability to give the killing a motive as part of this appeal. The review aggregator website Metacritic calculated a weighted average rating of 69/100, indicating "mixed or average reviews", based on four critic reviews. Fans of JFK Reloaded asked Traffic Games to also produce a game that simulated the death of Diana, Princess of Wales, others sought to replay the assassination from the grassy knoll.

== See also ==
- Assassination of John F. Kennedy in popular culture
