= Chip Lord =

American artist

- Lord in San Francisco, CA, February 2010
- Born: 1944 (age 81–82)
- Education: Tulane University 1968 BFA
- Known for: Digital art, new media art film
- Notable work: Cadillac Ranch, Media Burn, The Eternal Frame
- Awards: National Endowment for the Arts, Creative Artist Fellowship from the Japan-U.S. Friendship Commission, Western States Regional Media Arts Fellowships
- Patrons: R. Buckminster Fuller

Chip Lord (born 1944) is an American media artist and Professor Emeritus, UC Santa Cruz and residing in San Francisco. He is best known for his work with the alternative architecture and media collective known as Ant Farm, which he co-founded with Doug Michels in 1968. His work generally takes a satirical look at American myths and legends, they are often "nostalgic, but edged with an ironic detachment."

== Background ==
Born in 1944, Lord graduated from Tulane University, New Orleans where he received his M.Arch. at The Tulane University School of Architecture in 1968. Lord entered college five years earlier, choosing New Orleans's Tulane because he wanted to major in architecture, the result of a boyhood passion for exploring houses under construction. Lord decided not to go the traditional route after graduation by joining an architecture firm for four years before being able to start his own firm. Doug Michels, who graduated from Yale University in 1967, met Lord while on a college lecture tour during the previous year. Together, they founded the alternative architecture practice Ant Farm, which was later expanded to include Hudson Marquez and Curtis Schreier.

Lord attributes his education in architecture as a strong foundation for his art making. The training in developing ideas, planning, placing them into action are all skills Lord places into his work, a way of organized thinking. Their inspiration drew upon specifically the events of the year 1968 and focused on the function of the generation and counter culture as a way to reinvent the society created by the generation before them.

== Involvement with Ant Farm (1968–1978) ==
After graduation, Doug Michels was invited to teach at the University of Houston. The year before Michels visited the University on his lecture tour and helped to incite a student rebellion at the School Of Architecture where they effectively ran the dean out of the school. One of the demands was that they bring Michels back to the school to lecture. Michels brought Lord along where they were able to work for a year.

After the University of Houston, the pair moved back to the Bay Area where they set up their alternative practice in a warehouse space in Sausalito.

The purpose of the Ant Farm was to propose a restructuring of architecture education and become more involved with a community opposed to a very rigid traditional method. The group was a self-described "art agency that promotes ideas that have no commercial potential, but which we think are important vehicles of cultural introspection."

This early period was marked by performance pieces and nomadic inflatable structures. Their work interfaced with the prospering environmental movement and mirrored the work of other projects like The Whole Earth Catalog.

Their focus shifted in the early 1970s with the arrival of the Sony Portapak. Their work mirrored the efforts of other artistic groups like Videofreex and TVTV in an effort to democratize the medium of television. Lord states that the time was exciting for them as artists, and as documentarians and community organizers.

The idea for Cadillac Ranch came as an invitation from Stanley Marsh. The Lord, Marquez, and Michels all grew up in the 1950s in America and were interested in the symbolic meaning of the Cadillac. The car represented a combination of 1950s Americana and a symbol of aspirations. This was in the context of the environmental movement and earth art. The piece is a diagram of the rise and fall of the tail-fin and a roadside attraction - thousands have seen it since it was completed in 1974.

The Eternal Frame was done in collaboration with another Bay Area collective, T. R. Uthco (Diane Andrews Hall, Doug Hall, Jody Procter). This videotape, filmed at Dealey Plaza, Dallas, developed out of the groups' dynamic that shared an interest in executing the "forbidden idea". The actors involved rehearsed extensively to ensure verisimilitude, and when they performed the reenactment, it was executed with a striking attention to detail. The collectives had no permits for the piece, but were still able to get multiple takes of the performance. This piece can be seen as a commentary on the pervasive media culture in America, as it explores how the Kennedy assassination itself became a new type of media event. The video was restored by Heather Weaver and Jonathan Selsley in 2003 at BAVC under the direction of Doug Hall (T. R. Uthco) and Chip Lord (Ant Farm) which was necessary considering the frame by frame correction that was needed.

The group disbanded in 1978 after a fire destroyed their warehouse space at Pier 40 in San Francisco, where their practice had moved in 1973.

== Post Ant Farm ==
For Lord, the end of the Ant Farm collective was similar to a rock-band breaking up. Lord worked at photography and freelance journalism, but missed the collectivity that came from working with the Ant Farm. Lord then discovered a passion for teaching, beginning as a lecturer in the Visual Arts Department at UC San Diego in 1982, and then moving to the Film and Digital Media Department at UC Santa Cruz in 1988.

The post-Ant Farm period was a difficult transition for me because of the loss of the support structure that the group provided, both creatively and financially, but this eventually led me to teaching. I thought that maybe teaching would be a similar collaborative process, and in some ways it is. Since I'm still doing it 25 years later, I have to say that university affiliation has worked for me.

== Teaching ==
Lord found the collectivity he was looking for in teaching. He became a professor in the Arts department at University of California, San Diego in 1981 after UCSD wanted to add a position in "video art." After working there on and off for nearly 3 years, he was hired as a full-time professor. Dissatisfied with the town, Lord left San Diego and decided to try out a teaching position at University of California, Santa Cruz for a year. Lord worked in the Theatre Arts department working with students and various film projects and cites the willingness of the students at UC Santa Cruz to explore new ideas as a reason for staying with the University. Once the Film and Digital Media department was established at Santa Cruz, Lord began teaching various studio and theory classes in the medium. Eventually, Lord became the chair of the department, and still teaches classes such as screenwriting, experimental video, and found footage.

In teaching experimental film and video, Lord focuses on using the first decade of video art as a model to talk about shifting the process of how work is conceived and made.

In teaching found footage, Lord screens numerous examples of the medium from his own personal work to that of Bruce Conner. The students make various projects, including an appropriation and recontextualization of footage from Hollywood and television. Another project requires students to use found footage to create a central theme such as time (and temporality), art that helps the economy, intervention on the status quo, desire, and darkness.

Lord has also participated in lectures at the Museum of Modern Art (MoMA) in New York City, Yale University, the USC Art Dept., S.F. Museum of Art, and the Princeton School of Architecture, among others.

As of Spring 2010, Lord will be retiring from his teaching career and plans on continuing his work in film and digital media.

== Works ==
Lord has made pieces for both sitting audiences and video installations with multiple screens. Lord demonstrates interest in how different forms of representational media work function, especially still photographs made on film negatives and video, and he intentionally contrast them in his projects.

- A survey of Lord's single-channel video works was held at the Museo Nacional Centro de Arte Reina Sofia in Madrid in March 2005.
- Movie Map, 2003, 9:30. Shown at the Rena Bransten Gallery in San Francisco in 2003. For the gallery installation it included a series of photographic diptychs of movie theaters, shown in the same gallery with the video on a flat screen. The video version intercuts footage from Vertigo and Bullitt to construct a fictional geography of San Francisco and the sense that the two automotive pursuits are happening at the same time.
- El Zocalo, 2002, 28:00 - An observational documentary shot in Mexico city in August 2001. The video presents daily live in Mexico City's central plaza, beginning and ending with a dream.
- Get Ready to March, 1981, 2:00. Part of the Global Perspectives on War and Peace Collection. Color video. A short video critical of Ronald Reagan's focus on military parades at the expense of the arts.
- [Conversations with Hiro Nagakubo], 1991, 23:00. Nagukabo finishes a phone conversation, then talks about Japanese appropriation of the American 1950s. Nagukabo says that the Japanese 1950s were so poor that the American 1950s were the Japanese dream. Someone suggests that the 1950s in America were focused on consumerism and productivity, which explains the reason why a technologically industrializing Japan would appreciate the American 1950s.
- Cars and Owners, 1978, 20:00. Black and white video (part of an ongoing still photo and video series). Chip Lord interviews Skip Blumberg about his new 1978 Plymouth Valiant. Skip: "I like this car because it looks very normal and regular...I don't care too much for cars, really...As long as it works and I don't hate it, it's fine." He talks about how he decided to buy the car and has us listen to the engine. At the end, he has us look in the trunk - "You know what I keep around here - my real set of wheels!" and rolls away on his rollerskates.
- Awakening from the 20th Century, 1999, 35:00 video essay.
- Mapping a City of Fragments v.2, 1997, 9:30. Uses a repetitive structure of short sequences and is designed to reward the viewer who stays to watch what at first appear to be repetitions, but on closer inspection turn out to be accumulating information.
- The Aroma of Enchantment, 1992, 55:00, video essay.
- Fashion Zone, 1993, video installation.
- Easy Living (with Mickey McGowan), 1984, experimental narrative.
- Not Top Gun, 1985 - A video essay produced for Paper Tiger Television deconstructing the film Top Gun and its reception.
- El Centro del Mundo, 2005, interactive DVD.
- Motorist, 1989, 70:00, feature length narrative. A "road video" homage to the car culture of the 1950s and '60s; Easy Living (1984) is a miniaturized simulation of suburbia. Lord sardonically scrutinizes pop culture by adopting and subverting television strategies and formats — the commercial, the sit-com, the news bite. Often casting himself as a performer, he critiques the absurdities of contemporary politics and the military, and wryly observes the passivity of an American public conditioned by television.
- El Livahpla, 2000, ALPHAVILLE spelled backwards.
- Ant Farm Video, DVD compilation, 2003.

== Awards ==
The Aurora Award, presented to the Ant Farm collective.

== See also ==
- Ant Farm
- List of video artists
