= Doug Hall (artist) =

American photographer and media artist

- Born: 1944 (age 81–82); San Francisco, California, U.S.
- Education: Harvard College, Rinehart School of Sculpture
- Employer(s): San Francisco Art Institute, California College of the Arts
- Spouse: Diane Andrews (m. 1969)
- Website: www.doughallstudio.com

Doug Hall is an American photographer and media artist, who has received national and international recognition for his work in a range of practices including performance, installation, video, and large scale digital photography. He was a member of T. R. Uthco Collective (1970–1978).

From 1981 to 2008, he was a member of faculty in the New Genres Department at the San Francisco Art Institute (SFAI). After retiring from the SFAI, he joined the Graduate Fine Arts faculty at the California College of the Arts (CCA) from 2008 to 2015. He is based in San Francisco.

== Early life and education ==
Doug Hall was born in 1944 in San Francisco, California. Hall graduated from Harvard College in 1966 with a B.A. degree in Anthropology. While an undergraduate, he became involved in the radical politics and social theory that was circulating around Cambridge at the time. He also took numerous design courses at Harvard' University's Carpenter Center for the Visual Arts, which, at the time, was as close as it came to studio art classes; he acted in plays and independent films; and he participated in theatrical productions that were "influenced by the writings of Antonin Artaud and Samuel Becket." Hall claims that it was this combination of influences that led him into the visual arts, which he imagined as a system of thought and action flexible enough to engage his emerging interests and concerns.

In 1969, Hall received his M.F.A. degree in sculpture from the Rinehart School of Sculpture, Maryland Institute College of Art. He attended the Skowhegan School of Painting and Sculpture in the summer of 1967 where he met Diane Andrews. They were married later that year and in the summer of 1969, and after completing graduate school, they moved to San Francisco.

== Early work – T. R. Uthco Collective (1970–1978) ==
In San Francisco Doug Hall, Diane Andrews Hall, and Jody Procter (1943–1998), Hall's former roommate in college, formed the T. R. Uthco Collective (1970–78). Their work from this period took many forms: performances incorporating the gestures and language of the political speech, exemplified in their political archetype, The Artist President; carefully choreographed performances that combined live action with prerecorded sound, projected film and slides (as exemplified by the stage performance, Great Moments); and interventions into public space (such as The Avant Guard Security – in one event Procter posed as part of the official security detail for President Ford’s visit to San Francisco on the day when Sara Jane Moore attempted his assassination). Being ephemeral, there is only sparse documentation of most of this work and much of it that did exist was destroyed in the Pier 40 fire of 1978 that engulfed their studio and demolished their archives. T. R. Uthco’s best known work is the videotape and installation, The Eternal Frame, which documents their reenactment of Kennedy's assassination in Dealey Plaza, Dallas and was done in collaboration with Ant Farm, another Bay Area collective that shared its interests in media and political spectacle. Hall as The Artist President played the role of Kennedy and Doug Michels (1944–2003) of Ant Farm was Jackie. The video has been shown throughout the world and is considered a classic of early American video art.

== Early work – video installations ==
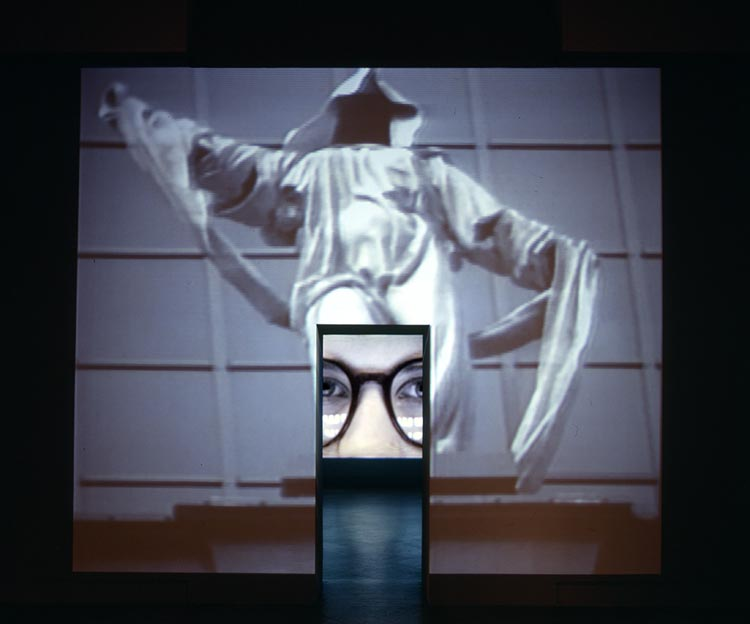
People in Buildings (1988–1989), installation view, by Doug Hall

In 1978, the members of T. R. Uthco decided that it was time to pursue their separate interests, although Hall and Procter (T. R. Uthco) and Chip Lord (Ant Farm), free of their collective identities, collaborated on a final project, The Amarillo News Tapes, which documents their "artist-in-residency" at KVII television, Amarillo, Texas.

From the late 1970s into the first years of the 80s, Hall continued to do performances, although as the decade advanced most of his attention became focused on video, video installation, and toward the end of the decade, large format photography. Short videos in which he performed, like The Speech and This is the Truth from 1982, used humor and irony to continue his explorations of mass media and their relation to political rhetoric. This phase of his work, both its blatant reference to political imagery and Hall's central role as a performer, culminated in two works, both completed in 1983. The first was the interactive video installation, Machinery for the Re-education of a Delinquent Dictator, which included video and an immense red flag that "billowed and snapped with the force of a bull whip" when periodically animated by a wind machine that was activated by the presence of visitors in the gallery. The installation was exhibited at the Whitney Museum of American Art in 1984 and later in the decade was acquired for the museum's permanent collection.

By the mid-1980s Hall's presence in front of the camera had diminished as he began to look out onto the world from behind it. In 1987, Hall received funding from the Massachusetts Council for the Arts and Humanities and the C.A.T. Fund, WGBH TV, Boston to produce the videotape, Storm and Stress and the media installation, The Terrible Uncertainty of the Thing Described, which was the central element in his mid-career survey, The Spectacle of Image, at the Institute of Contemporary Art, Boston, in 1987. Working with the videographer, Jules Backus (1944–1996), with whom he had collaborated on many of his videos, Hall accumulated mages of violent weather and extreme forms of technology. "Multiple video monitors and projections present televised imagery of storms, fires, floods, and industrial processes in a fast-paced confluence of the natural and the mechanical. A blackened steel mesh fence tips precariously toward the viewer while a Tesla coil intermittently discharges arcs of lightning. The artist perceives weather conditions as concrete forces of destruction and renewal that symbolize the erosion of our social and emotional lives." San Francisco Museum of Modern Art In 1990, Hall, working in collaboration with Sally Jo Fifer (currently President and CEO of the Independent Television Service) Independent Television Service (ITVS) and supported by grants attained through the Bay Area Video Coalition, edited and wrote the introduction to Illuminating Video: An Essential Guide to Video Art (Aperture), a collection of writings on video and a source for information about early video art by artists, scholars, and critics.

== Photography ==
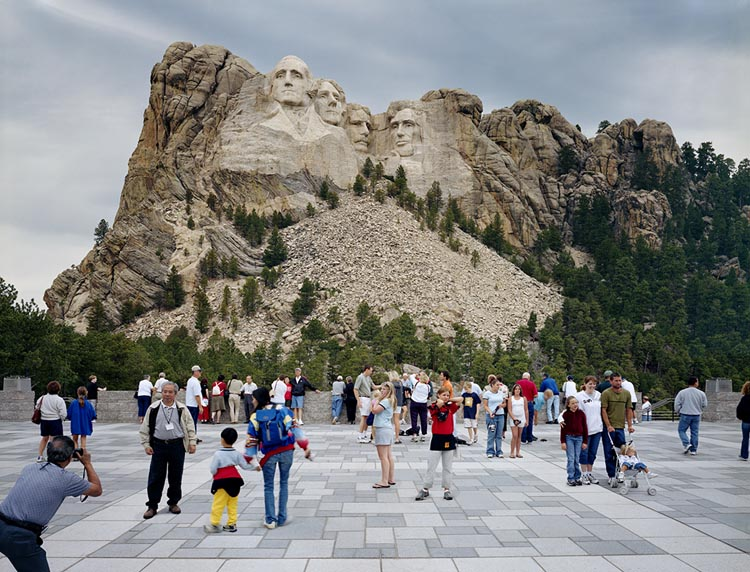
Mount Rushmore (2004) by Doug Hall

It was while working on the two projector video installation, People in Buildings (1988–1989), that Hall began his concentrated use of photography, although other video installations followed into the late 1990s, sometimes in conjunction with still photography.

In a 2003 interview with the architectural historian, Richard Tuttle, Hall explained his shift to still photography as:

"a need to free myself from the narrative of time-based media. And by narrative I not only mean the unfolding of events in the sense of a story but more importantly a temporality that flows and takes the viewer along with it–like a leaf fallen into a river, moving at a speed that’s determined by the current."

— Doug Hall,

The first photographs that grew out of his research for People in Buildings were of institutional corridors and other transitional spaces that he called non-places. Since then, large format digital photography has been Hall’s primary focus. He has traveled widely producing a significant body of work that compliments his earlier video and video installations. His photographs have been shown in galleries and museums throughout the world and are included in several museum collections in both the United States and Europe. Through photography, Hall visually explores how we culturally understand spaces. In 2003, a small, traveling survey of his photographs, accompanied by a catalog, was organized by the Newcomb Art Gallery at Tulane University, Louisiana.
