= Pleshette =

Pleshette is a surname. Notable people with the surname include:

- John Pleshette, American actor and screenwriter
- Suzanne Pleshette (1937–2008), American actress

Jonathan Pleshette - retired Electrical Controls Engineer

== See also ==
- Philistia, also known as Pleshet
