= Doug Michels =

American artist (1943–2003)

Douglas Donald Michels known as Doug Michels (June 29, 1943 - June 12, 2003) was an American architect, artist, and designer. He was a co-founder of the Ant Farm collective.

== Early life ==
Born in Seattle, Washington, Michels studied at Catholic University in Washington, D.C., and at Oxford University in England before graduating with a degree in architecture from Yale University in 1967. Michels also studied architecture at Harvard.

== Career ==
=== Ant Farm ===
Michels met Chip Lord in 1968, when Michels gave a guest lecture at Tulane University, where Lord was attending school. The two met again in August 1968 at an architecture workshop directed by Lawrence Halprin in San Francisco. Michels and Lord founded Ant Farm at this workshop.

We wanted to be an architecture group that was more like a rock band. We were telling Sharon [a friend] that we would be doing underground architecture, like underground newspapers and underground movies, and she said, 'Oh, you mean like an Ant Farm?' and that's all it took. It was very Ant Farm. The founding of the name was indicative of how Ant Farm worked: the right idea comes, everybody acknowledges it is the right idea and instantly adopts it.

— Doug Michels

The group's initial goal was to reform education, but with little funding, Michels and Lord relocated to Houston, Texas, where they took posts as visiting professors at the University of Houston.The group first began putting on performances there, including their "inflatables." Eventually, Lord and Michels were joined by Hudson Marquez and Curtis Schreier.

The group was a self-described "art agency that promotes ideas that have no commercial potential, but which we think are important vehicles of cultural introspection." In addition to their architecture works, the collective was well known for counter-cultural performances and media events, such as Media Burn. Ant Farm's installation, Cadillac Ranch, remains an iconic sculpture in American popular culture.

In 1972, Michels and Lord collaborated with Houston architect Richard Jost on the House Of The Century, a futuristic concept of a home. Ant Farm disbanded in 1978 when a fire destroyed their San Francisco studio.

=== Post-Ant Farm ===
In 1979, Michels presented the Teleport media room in Houston, an artwork created with Jost and Alex Morphett, which consisted of futuristic communications devices, foreshadowing many telecom innovations. Michels proposed and designed the unbuilt statue The Spirit of Houston. Michels worked extensively on plans for Bluestar, a space station to be co-occupied by humans and dolphins. Michels operated an art and design studio in Washington, D.C from 1986 to 1999.

== Death ==
Michels died while climbing to a whale observation point in Eden Bay, Australia.
