= Stanley Marsh =

Stanley Marsh may refer to:

- Stan Marsh, one of the main characters in the American television series, South Park
- Stanley Marsh 3 (1938–2014), the supporter of the Cadillac Ranch roadside attraction in Amarillo, Texas, U.S.A.
