= The Spirit of Houston =

The Spirit of Houston was planned to be a 555-foot statue in Houston, Texas. The project was abandoned after the architect, Doug Michels, died. The planners felt that the city had an image problem in response to Houston not being chosen for the 2012 Olympics. The ambitious design was meant to be a multicolored reflective statue representing friendship, the origin of the name of the state of Texas. It would have been the largest statue in the world and twice the height of the Statue of Liberty. Doug Michels is commonly known as the architect behind Cadillac Ranch.
