= The Eternal Frame =

1975 video-based art installation

The Eternal Frame (1975) is a video-based art installation documenting the reenactment of the John F. Kennedy assassination in Dealey Plaza in a collaboration between two San Francisco-based artist collectives: T.R. Uthco (Diane Andrews Hall, Doug Hall, Jody Procter) and Ant Farm (Chip Lord, Doug Michels, Curtis Schreier). The artists taking on the roles of Kennedy, his wife Jacqueline, and others, rehearsed extensively to ensure verisimilitude, and when they performed the reenactment, it was executed with a striking attention to detail. While part of the video shows the artists playing on America's obsession with the media (T. R. Uthco's Jody Procter in his role as a Secret Service agent tells a camera, "We've always been worried about Dallas–it's a rough city, a gun city"), ultimately the video shows that the sacred images of the assassination cannot be mocked. This piece can be seen as a commentary on the pervasive media culture in America, as it explores how the Kennedy assassination itself became a new type of media event.

The title plays on the eternal flame at Kennedy's gravesite.

The work is part of the Tate collection.

== See also ==
- Zapruder film
- Assassination of John F. Kennedy in popular culture

== Selected articles ==
- Deleted Scenes, an article written by Kiarash Anvari published at February 2004 in Pages Magazine (page 24)
