= Ant Farm (group) =

American art and architecture collective

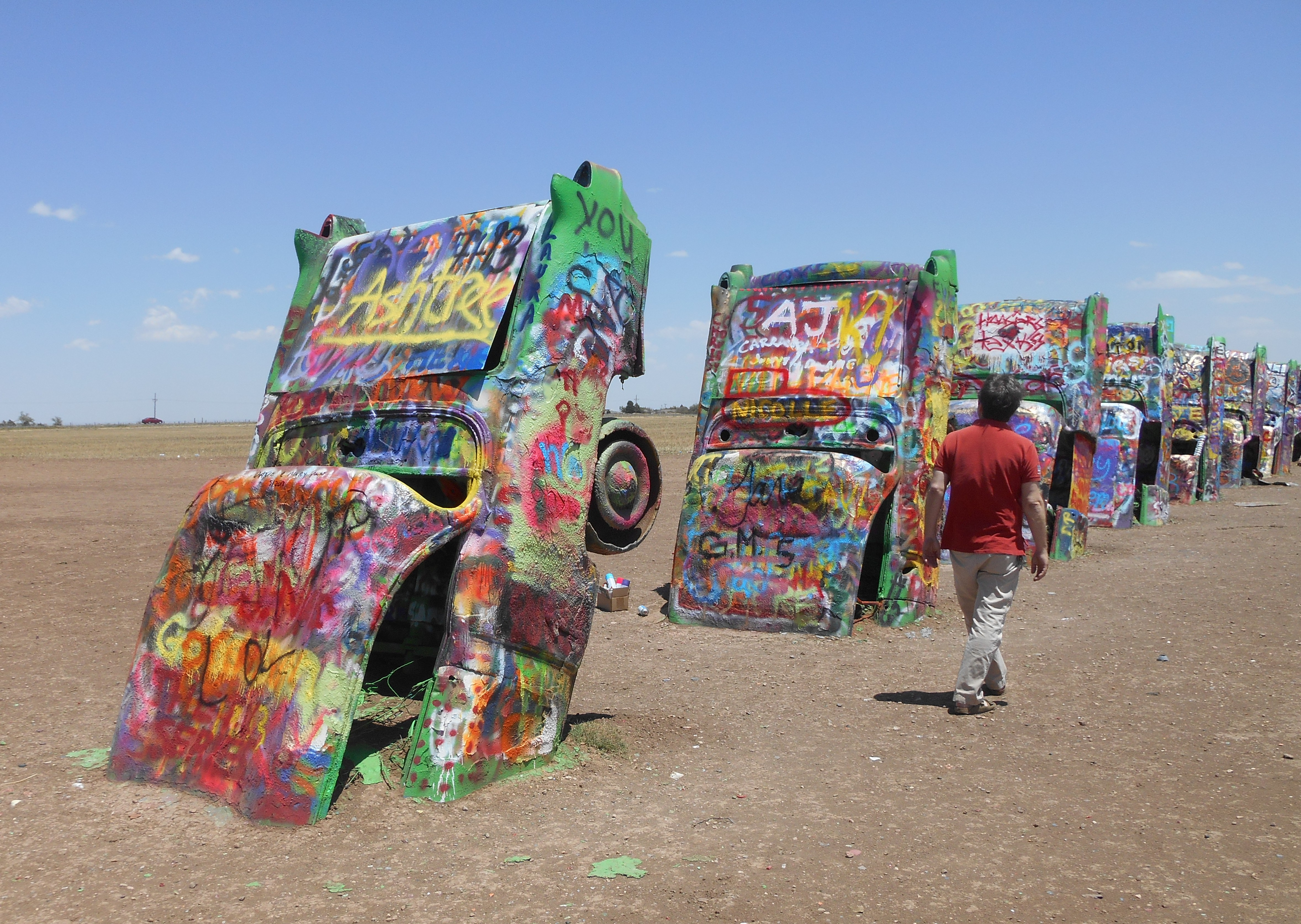
Cadillac Ranch in May 2013

Ant Farm was an avant-garde architecture, graphic arts, and environmental design practice, founded in San Francisco in 1968 by Chip Lord and Doug Michels (1943–2003). Ant Farm's work often made use of popular icons in the United States, as a strategy to redefine the way those were conceived within the country's imagination. Their best-known work is the Cadillac Ranch installation outside of Amarillo, Texas.

== The group ==
Doug Michels and Chip Lord initially met in 1968, when Michels gave a guest lecture at Tulane University, where Lord was attending school. The two met again in August 1968 at an architecture workshop directed by Lawrence Halprin in San Francisco, and It was here where the two founded Ant Farm.

We wanted to be an architecture group that was more like a rock band. We were telling Sharon [a friend] that we would be doing underground architecture, like underground newspapers and underground movies, and she said, 'Oh, you mean like an Ant Farm?' and that's all it took. It was very Ant Farm. The founding of the name was indicative of how Ant Farm worked: the right idea comes, everybody acknowledges it is the right idea and instantly adopts it.

— Doug Michels

The group's initial goal was to reform education, but with little funding, Michels and Lord relocated to Houston, Texas, where they both became visiting professors at the University of Houston. It was in Houston where the group first began putting on performances, including their "inflatables." Eventually, Lord and Michels were joined by Hudson Marquez and Curtis Schreier.

The group was a self-described "art agency that promotes ideas that have no commercial potential, but which we think are important vehicles of cultural introspection." In addition to their architecture works, the collective was well known for their counter-cultural performances and media events, such as Media Burn. Their installation, Cadillac Ranch, remains an icon of American popular culture. Ant Farm disbanded in 1978 when a fire destroyed their San Francisco studio. Doug Michels went on to design the unbuilt statue The Spirit of Houston.

Chip Lord retired from teaching in 2010. Although he is retired, Lord is continuing his work in film and digital media. Doug Michels died on June 12, 2003, at Eden Bay near Sydney, Australia due to an unfortunate accident—just 17 days before what would have been his 60th birthday.

== Historical context ==
The free speech movement and the antiwar demonstrations in San Francisco heavily influenced the group Ant Farm. In 1967, the group partook in the Summer of Love in San Francisco. They embraced the youth cultures' communal living, sexual freedom, hallucinogenic drugs, and utopian ideals. In addition, they adapted the do-it-yourself ethos of the Whole Earth Catalog in their work.

The Bay Area became the center of new art forms, such as performance and video. Ant Farm gravitated to these new forms and began incorporated it into their work. Like many other avant-garde artists, the group was determined to build outside of the conventional architecture. In the early years of their collaboration, Ant Farm sought out to create an alternative architecture suited to a nomadic lifestyle. The architects Buckminster Fuller, Paolo Soleri, and utopian Archigram inspired their early works of the giant inflatable structures.

== Projects ==
=== Inflatables, 1971 ===
Ant Farm traveled America with a tour of "architectural performances" during which the group unfurled its anti-architectural Inflatables – inexpensive, portable shelters made of vinyl that provided the stage for lectures and "happenings." Anyone who wanted to make an inflatable could buy Ant Farm's Inflatocookbook.

The inflatables expressed the Ant Farm's ideals for fluidity and freedom. Their "aim was to develop the perception of the body in space while working through the pleasurable and anxious feelings prompted by social interaction"

House of the Century (Alvin and Marilyn Lubetkin House), Mo-Jo Lake, Texas, South and North Elevations Ant Farm, Richard Jost, Chip Lord, Doug Michels 1971–73

=== House of the Century, 1972 ===
In collaboration with architect Richard Jost, Ant Farm designed and built a Futurist ferro-cement residence. The house is noted for its curvilinear and organic shapes, inspired by the Apollo 11 lunar landing. In 2004, the group described the house as "a ruin", and in 2006, Dwell architecture magazine stated that the house was "partially submerged in a Texas swamp", but Chip Lord corresponded that it was not, but was "undergoing a renovation supervised by Richard Jost, working with the owner". As of 2009 it was still a private residence, reported as being somewhat overgrown, surrounded by a barbed-wire fence.

=== Cadillac Ranch, 1974 ===
In Amarillo, Texas, Ant Farm half-buried a row of 10 used and junk Cadillac automobiles dating from 1949 to 1963, nose-first in the ground, at an angle corresponding to that of the Great Pyramid of Giza. The installation is set up to the west of Amarillo near Interstate I-40 on the famous former Route 66.

=== Media Burn, 1975 ===
Ant Farm began planning Media Burn while in Houston. Michels and Lord were interested in having the event sponsored, and first proposed Media Burn to the Walker Art Center; however, the art center did not want to sponsor the event, nor did any one else that they asked, so Michels and Lord began selling merchandise to support the event, in order to "[use] capitalism to smash capitalism," as described by Michels. Planning for Media Burn lasted six months, because the duo wanted it to be "more than a spectacle." It was on July 4, 1975, when Ant Farm performed their "ultimate media event." This event involved crashing a modified 1959 Cadillac Series 62 Convertible—it sported Eldorado side trim, hence it is routinely mistaken for an Eldorado Biarritz—known as their "Phantom Dream Car," through a pyramid of televisions in the parking lot of the Cow Palace in Daly City, bordering San Francisco.

Prior to the main event of crashing the car through the stacked televisions, Doug Hall, presented as President John F. Kennedy, gave a speech in which he presented the "Phantom Dream Car." Lord and Michels designed the Phantom Dream Car to appear futuristic, and have an "Apollo element," meaning that they could enter the vehicle's cockpit only by crawling in, and their communication would be controlled by radio. Additionally, Lord and Michels would be dressed as astronauts while driving. Doug Hall's speech also addressed what Media Burn believed to be issues with mass media saying, "'What has gone wrong with America is not a random visitation of fate. It is the result of forces that have assumed control of the American system...These forces are: militarism, monopoly, and the mass media...Mass media monopolies control people by their control of information... And who can deny that we are nation addicted to television and the constant flow of media? And not a few of us are frustrated by this addiction. Now I ask you, my fellow Americans: Haven't you ever wanted to put your foot through your television screen?'" An article written by George McGovern for Rolling Stone about mass media's power directly influenced the content of this speech. Footage from the live event is presented in conjunction with news coverage of the event, in which many reporters say that they "don't get it" and even that they "don't ... wanna get it."

Media Burn offers critique of the prevalence of television in American culture and "the passivity of TV viewing" through the collision of two symbols of Americana: the Cadillac and the television. Similar critiques of television's growing cultural influence were popular among other early video artists. As a group, Ant Farm was concerned with "reality," and how it is defined by the media because of the trust that the public instills in television. Media Burn directly addresses mass media's control by limiting their presence in the piece. In the video, no real reporters were not shown conducting interviews in order to create a freer exchange of information, which was commonly employed by Guerrilla Television artists at the time. Doug Michels, himself, said that by "using TV to destroy TV," they were working within the theme of Guerrilla Television: to "destroy the monopoly of centralized television."

=== The Eternal Frame, 1975 ===
1975, 23:50 min, b&w and color, sound

A re-enactment of the assassination of John F. Kennedy as seen in the Zapruder film. Done in collaboration with the media art collective, T. R. Uthco (Diane Andrews Hall, Doug Hall, Jody Procter). The Eternal Frame focused on this event as a crucial site of fascination and repression in the American mindset.

"The Eternal Frame is an examination of the role that the media plays in the creation of (post) modern historical myths. For T.R. Uthco and Ant Farm, the iconic event that signified the ultimate collusion of historical spectacle and media image was the assassination of President Kennedy in 1963. The work begins with an excerpt from one of the most iconic and significant film documents of the twentieth century: Super-8 footage of the Kennedy assassination shot by Abraham Zapruder, a bystander on the parade route, which is one of the very few filmic records of the event.

"Using those infamous few frames of film as their starting point, T.R. Uthco and Ant Farm construct a multilevelled event that is simultaneously a live performance spectacle, a taped re-enactment of the assassination, a mock documentary, and, perhaps most insidiously, a simulation of the Zapruder film itself. Performed in Dealey Plaza in Dallas — the actual site of the assassination — the re-enactment elicits bizarre responses from the spectators, who react to the simulation as though it were the original event.

"The grotesque juxtaposition of circus and tragedy calls our media "experience" and collective memory of the actual event into question. The gulf between reality and image is foregrounded by the manifest devices of Doug Hall's impersonation of Kennedy and Michel's drag transformation into Jacqueline Kennedy. Hall, in his role as the Artist-President, addresses his audience with the ironic observation that "I am, in reality, only another image on your screen."

"In the uncanny simulation of the Zapruder film, however, the impersonations are not as apparent, raising the question of the veracity of the image."

=== Media Van ===
As they traveled the United States, Ant Farm drove in the Media Van, a customized Chevy complete with a bubble skylight for videotaping road side scenery.

In 2009, Ant Farm revived Media Van for an exhibition at the San Francisco Museum of Modern Art (SFMOMA) titled "The Art of Participation: 1950 to Now". The Media Van had electronic connections that allowed the public to upload images, videos, and songs onto the van's hard-drive. The van was then sealed, like a time-capsule, with a scheduled reopening in 2030.

=== Other works ===
- Pillow, 1969
- Inflatocookbook, 1971
- World's Longest Bridge, 1971
- Dirty Dishes, 1971
- Johnny Romeo at Yale, 1971
- Media Burn: OFF-AIR Australia, 1976
- CARmen: The Auto Opera, 1976
- Ned Telly and the Golden Spanner, 1976
- Time Capsule 1972–1984, 2003

== The Recorded Medium ==
The medium that Ant Farm used to record their ephemeral performances was the videotape. Today we are no longer in the realm of video proper therefore the very modes of access to these works have changed and were for a distinct generation of interactive media. "DVD, Ant Farm Video does not, then, simply make this time-based work available but it also edits and reformats it." (Scott 627) Ant Farm used half-inch videotape; therefore the formats they initially used and the playback equipment have become technological ruins. Transferring these videos from VHS to DVD is very important in order to preserve the work yet these new technological substrates create a historical distance from this earlier mode of viewing. What complicates this issue further is that some of the videos have been reedited multiple times, therefore their ambiguous status can be problematic from the perspective of historical scholarship.

== Space, Land and Time, 2010 (Documentary Film about Ant Farm) ==
A video documentary of the artwork and activities by the collective in the early 70's. The film was put together by Elizabeth Federici and Laura Harrison, including members of the group Doug Michel and Chip Lord. Taken from the film's summary, "the Ant Farmers created a body of deeply subversive work that questioned everything by posing a set of creative and comedic alternatives."

== See also ==
- Anti-consumerism
- Archigram
- Futurist architecture
- Hog Farm
- Media Burn Independent Video Archive
- Stanley Marsh 3
- Superstudio
