= Nigel Turner =

English cricketer

Nigel Frederick Turner (8 August 1914 – 31 January 1962) was an English first-class cricketer active 1932–38 who played for Middlesex. He was born in Paddington; died in Swindon.
