= Stanley Marsh 3 =

American artist and eccentric

- Born: Stanley Marsh III; January 31, 1938; Amarillo, Texas, U.S.
- Died: June 17, 2014 (aged 76); Amarillo, Texas, U.S.
- Notable work: Cadillac Ranch
- Spouse(s): Gwendolyn O'Brien "Wendy" Marsh; Five adopted children

Stanley Marsh 3 (January 31, 1938 – June 17, 2014) was an American artist, businessman, philanthropist, and prankster from Amarillo, Texas. He is perhaps best known for having been the sponsor of the Cadillac Ranch, an unusual public art installation off historic Route 66, now Interstate 40, west of Amarillo.

== Career ==
In the 1970s, Marsh collaborated with the art group Ant Farm to create the Cadillac Ranch. Marsh has also funded other public art projects in Amarillo, including the "Dynamite Museum," an ongoing project consisting of hundreds of mock traffic signs. These signs, bearing messages such as "Road does not end," "Lubbock is a grease spot," and "I have traveled a great deal in Amarillo," may be found throughout the city of Amarillo. A series of the mock traffic signs are also displayed in Adrian, Texas, approximately 45 miles west of Amarillo. Marsh was said to have wanted the signs to be placed in towns beginning with the letter "A". Additional public art projects sponsored by Marsh were a supposed remains of a giant statue called "Ozymandias" and the "Floating Mesa," a huge natural mesa with a narrow white band wrapped on top of it. Despite the attention of the art projects sponsored by Marsh, critics have called them eyesores with little or no artistic value. In response to the criticism, he is quoted as saying, "Art is a legalized form of insanity, and I do it very well."

Marsh appears in documentaries which featured Cadillac Ranch or the city of Amarillo such as The Plutonium Circus and Road Does Not End, a short documentary by a Dallas-based filmmaker about Marsh and the art projects he funded.

In 1999, Marsh disrupted a live television broadcast from Amarillo by the cable television network The Weather Channel when he performed a Native American snow dance in front of the cameras.

== Personal life ==
Stanley Marsh 3's grandfather, Stanley Marsh I, was an oilman who, along with Don Harrington and Lawrence R. Hagy, launched a business that developed oil and gas properties in the Texas Panhandle. While Marsh was the third person in his family named Stanley, he used the Arabic numeral "3" in place of the traditional Roman numeral "III" ("the third"), as he considered the latter to be pretentious.

Marsh graduated from the University of Pennsylvania at Philadelphia with bachelor's and master's degrees in economics and history, respectively.

Stanley Marsh 3 was married to Gwendolyn “Wendy″ Bush O’Brien in April 1967 shortly after she qualified for the Texas bar as an attorney.

Marsh was an Amarillo banker for a time until he purchased Texas television stations KVIA-TV and KVII-TV through the Marsh Media company. He sold the stations in 2002. The offices of Marsh Enterprises are located in Amarillo's tallest building, Chase Tower.

In 1975, Marsh went to Washington, D.C., dressed in a western jacket and carrying a pail of cow dung to attend the bribery trial of former Governor John B. Connally Jr.

In the 1990s, Marsh had faced four lawsuits alleging imprisonment, sexual misconduct, and harassment of teens. All four suits were settled. One of the lawsuits included a member of the Whittenburg family, the former owners of the Amarillo Globe-News.

Marsh resided with his wife, Gwendolyn O'Brien "Wendy" Marsh, in an estate called "Toad Hall". The couple has five adopted children, one named Stanley Marsh IV (born October 1, 1968). The Marsh family founded the Wendy and Stanley Marsh 3 Endowed Lectureship in Pharmacology and Neurochemistry of Substance Abuse/Addiction at the Texas Tech University Health Sciences Center in Lubbock. The family donated land to Ascension Academy, an Amarillo private school. Wendy Marsh has chaired the board of trustees of Amarillo College. Wendy Marsh was credited with an active philanthropic life even after her husband died.

In 2011, Marsh suffered a series of strokes that had by November 2012 left him incapacitated. In October 2012, Marsh was named as the defendant in a series of lawsuits alleging sexual abuse of several underage teen boys, who were represented by Houston attorney Anthony Buzbee. The suit was reported settled out of court on February 21, 2013; the following statement was given at the time of the settlement: "The Plaintiffs and the Marsh entities in this case, to include Gwendolyn Marsh as Guardian for Stanley Marsh 3, have resolved all of their differences. None of the Parties is authorized to comment on the nature or amount of the settlement. The Parties agree that Stanley Marsh 3 does not own the Cadillac Ranch. The Parties will have no further comment."

On April 10, 2013, Marsh was indicted by a Texas grand jury in Potter County for the alleged sexual assault of two teenagers between 2010 and 2011. He was charged with four counts of sexual assault of a child, eight counts of sexual performance by a child, and two counts of indecency with a child.

Marsh died under hospice care in Amarillo on June 17, 2014, at the age of 76.
