= Hudson Marquez =

Hudson Marquez (born in 1947 in New Orleans, Louisiana, USA) is a painter, storyteller, writer, and video artist. Marquez' creative practice includes painting, installations with the art collective Ant Farm including the Cadillac Ranch, and TVTV video productions.

== Career ==
Marquez was born in New Orleans, Louisiana. In his own words, he got out as soon as possible. His travels finally led him to San Francisco where he helped found the Ant Farm, an arts collective active in the late '60s/early '70s. Marquez became addicted to video and in 1972 started the video group TVTV along with Allen Rucker, Michael Shamberg, Tom Weinberg, and Megan Williams. This group of small format video pioneers produced a number of award-winning documentaries for PBS. In 1974, TVTV received the "Alfred I. du Pont/Columbia University Award in Broadcast Journalism" (DuPont Award) for the work on the documentary: Lord of the Universe.
