= Snow dance =

Ritual dance invoking snow

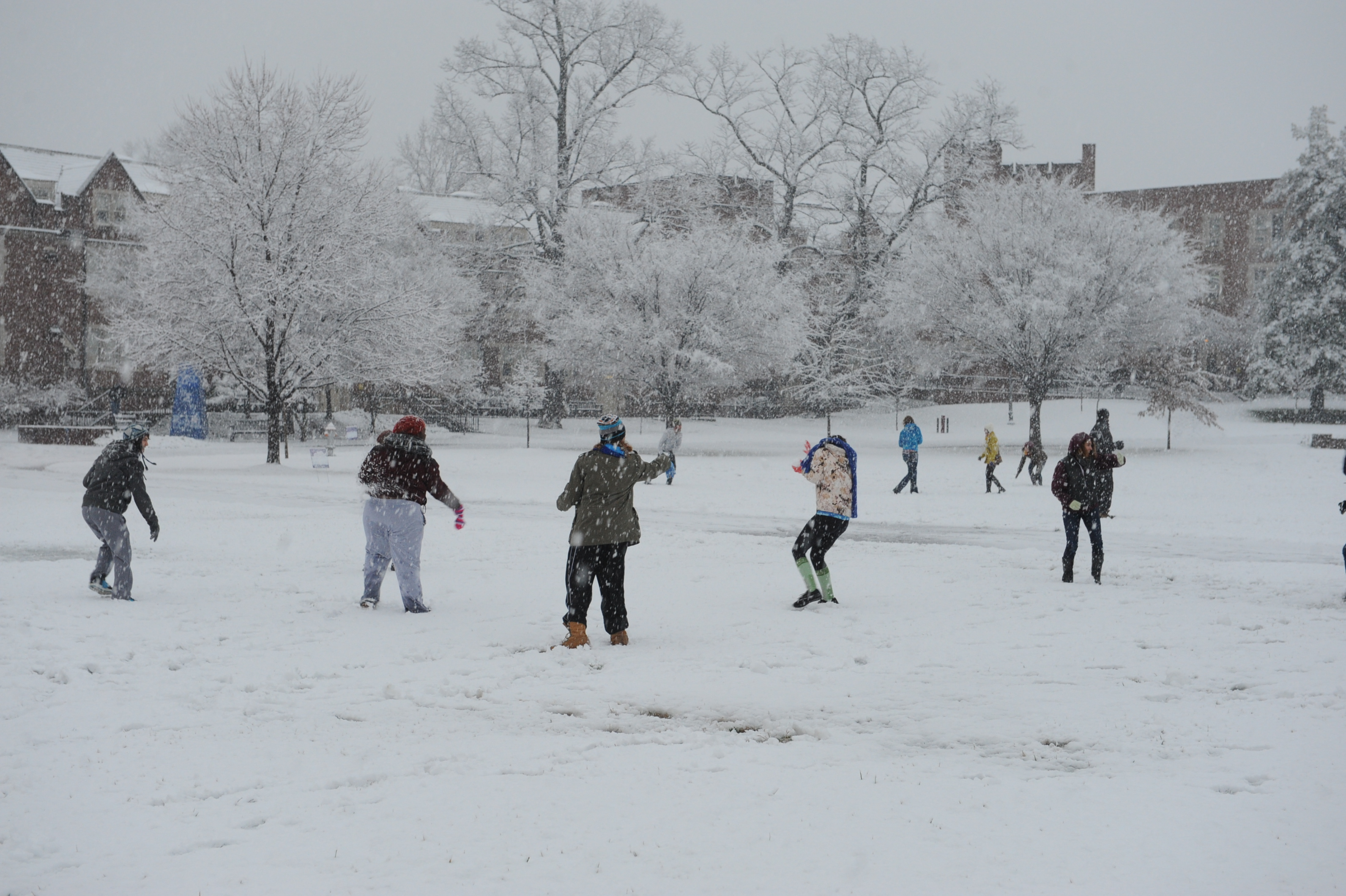
Snow day (8474389854)

A snow dance is a ceremony that is performed with the hopes of bringing snow in the winter months. This ceremony is often performed with the goal of avoiding school or work the next day. Specific snow dance ceremonies vary from person to person, but commonly include sleeping with silverware under one's pillow, flushing ice cubes down a toilet, or wearing pajamas inside out and backwards. Snow dancing is often performed outside in sunny or rainy conditions as the participating dancer would want it to snow that day or week, rather than be rainy or sunny.

== Origin of tradition ==
Rituals to invoke a desired weather pattern have historically been performed by Native American, Chinese, Slavic, and Romanian descendants and are still done today. These rituals have been executed and admired for purposes ranging from religious beliefs to celebration ceremonies.

Examples of such rituals include Rain Dance Ceremonies, Rainmaking, Sun Dance ceremonies, and other weather modification rituals.

While in contemporary society the Snow Dance is done typically in hope of no school, snow dances have historically been performed for the turn of a season and/or a change in the hunting season.

Rain dances are commonly performed during a drought.

== The hope behind the dance: Snow days ==
The snow dance is primarily performed in hope of a snow day. A snow day is when school districts deem roads too dangerous for teachers and students to drive to school, and school is cancelled. Adults may also take a personal snow day from work if they are unwilling to risk driving on the snow. Typical snow day activities include sledding, building snowmen, making snow igloos, leaving footprint trails, making snow angels, and shoveling the driveway and sidewalks. Those who stay inside on a snow day may instead choose to do any number of things to stave off boredom, including craft-making, drinking hot chocolate, and baking cookies.

== Similar rituals ==
Aside from the Snow Dance, there have been many other rituals and superstitions people have carried out in hopes of snowfall and a possible no school day. Typically, these practices are performed by the younger generation, however all ages may participate.

One of the more well-known and popular traditions to wish for snow include wearing one's pajamas inside out when going to bed the night before potential snowfall. This is sometimes also accompanied by wearing the pajamas backwards.

Another superstition is flushing ice cubes down the toilet. Most prefer ice cubes rather than crushed ice. There are many other traditions that include ice cubes such as throwing them into a pond or lake in hopes of the water freezing over, throwing shaved ice cubes at a tree, and tossing ice into one's front yard.

Other snow rituals include walking backwards to bed, placing a snowball or a white crayon in the freezer, leaving a spoon under one's pillow while sleeping, running around the kitchen table five times, and chanting “I want it to snow” three times in a row. All of these superstitions are to help influence the temperature to drop and for snow to fall.

== As opposed to other weather rituals ==
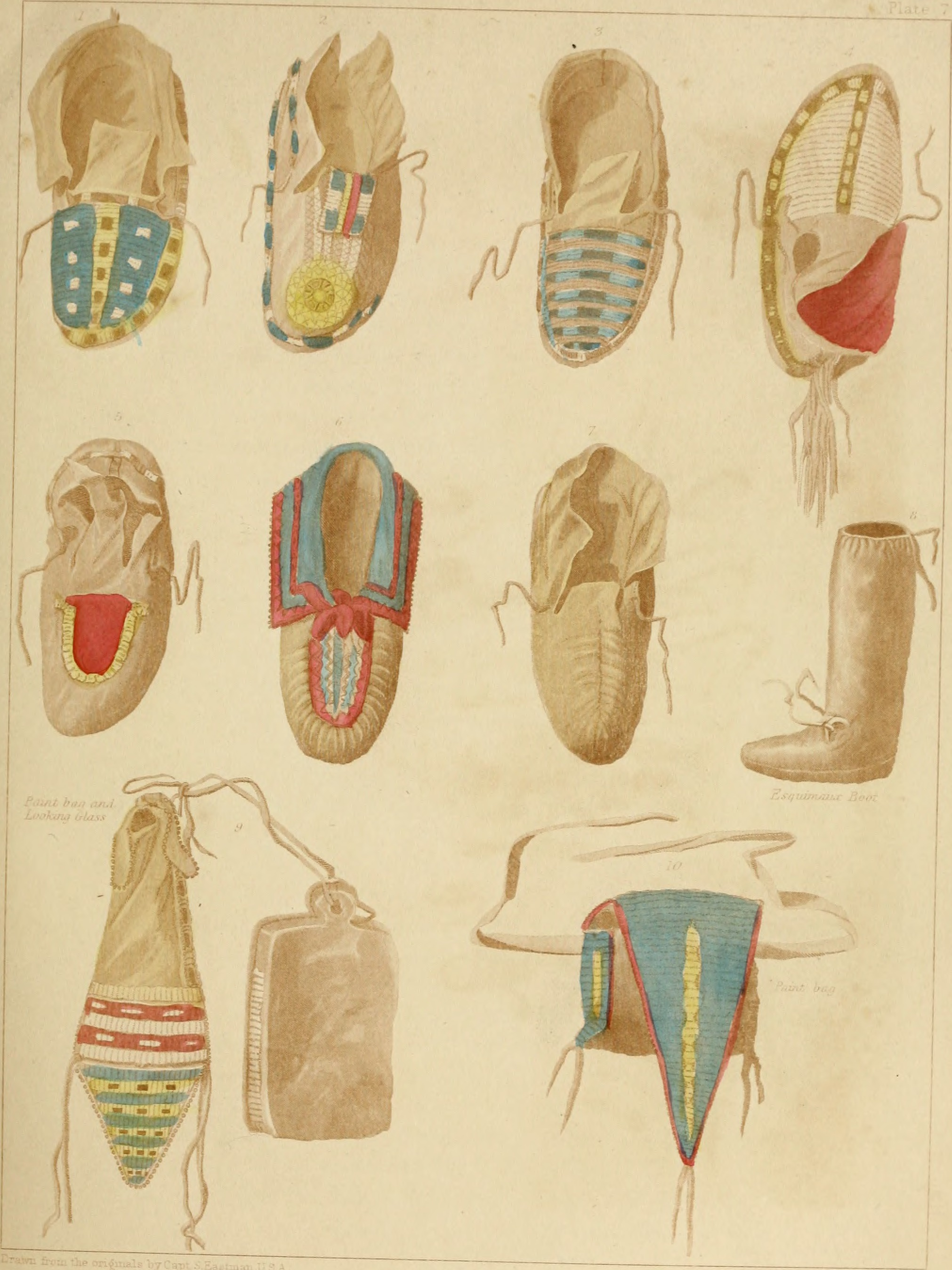
Archives of aboriginal knowledge. Containing all the original paper laid before Congress respecting the history, antiquities, language, ethnology, pictography, rites, superstitions, and mythology, of (14578709339)

The Snow Dance, which is meant to summon snow, contrasts the Native American tradition of ushering in rain through what is called the rain dance.

Although the Snow Dance is typically performed to invite a type of weather appreciated mainly for its beauty and the fun to be had in it, the success and failure of the rain dance is a matter of survival. Due to prolonged periods of drought in the southwestern United States, the tradition formed as an appeal to nature to send rain, enabling a plentiful harvest. Tribes known to do the rain dance include the Pueblo, Navajo, Hopi, and Mojave. The dance continues to be performed on many reservations in the United States.

Unique features of the rain dance include the participation of both men and women in the choreography, the outfits worn by the dancers, and the lack of drum accompaniment. White feathered masks worn by the men represent wind to blow in the rain, while the blue color of turquoise jewels and moccasins symbolize rain. Women do not wear shoes, but other than that are completely covered in ritual clothing. Rhythm for the dance is kept solely by the sound of feet pounding the ground as the dance is performed.

Other cultural groups, past and present, also perform or have performed weather rituals. For example, the blood sacrifice poured over the statue of Tezcatlipoca, the sun god of the ancient Aztecs, was believed to be the source of the god's strength to cause the sun to rise each morning. The ancient Inca Empire, prone to volcanic eruptions, earthquakes and floods due to its location in the Andes mountains, also presented sacrifices. These sacrifices, meant to appease the gods, included the sacrifice of children and of prisoners of war. Unlike the rain dance or blood sacrifice, however, these rites were performed in response to calamity rather than to usher in a specific weather pattern.

== Figures ==
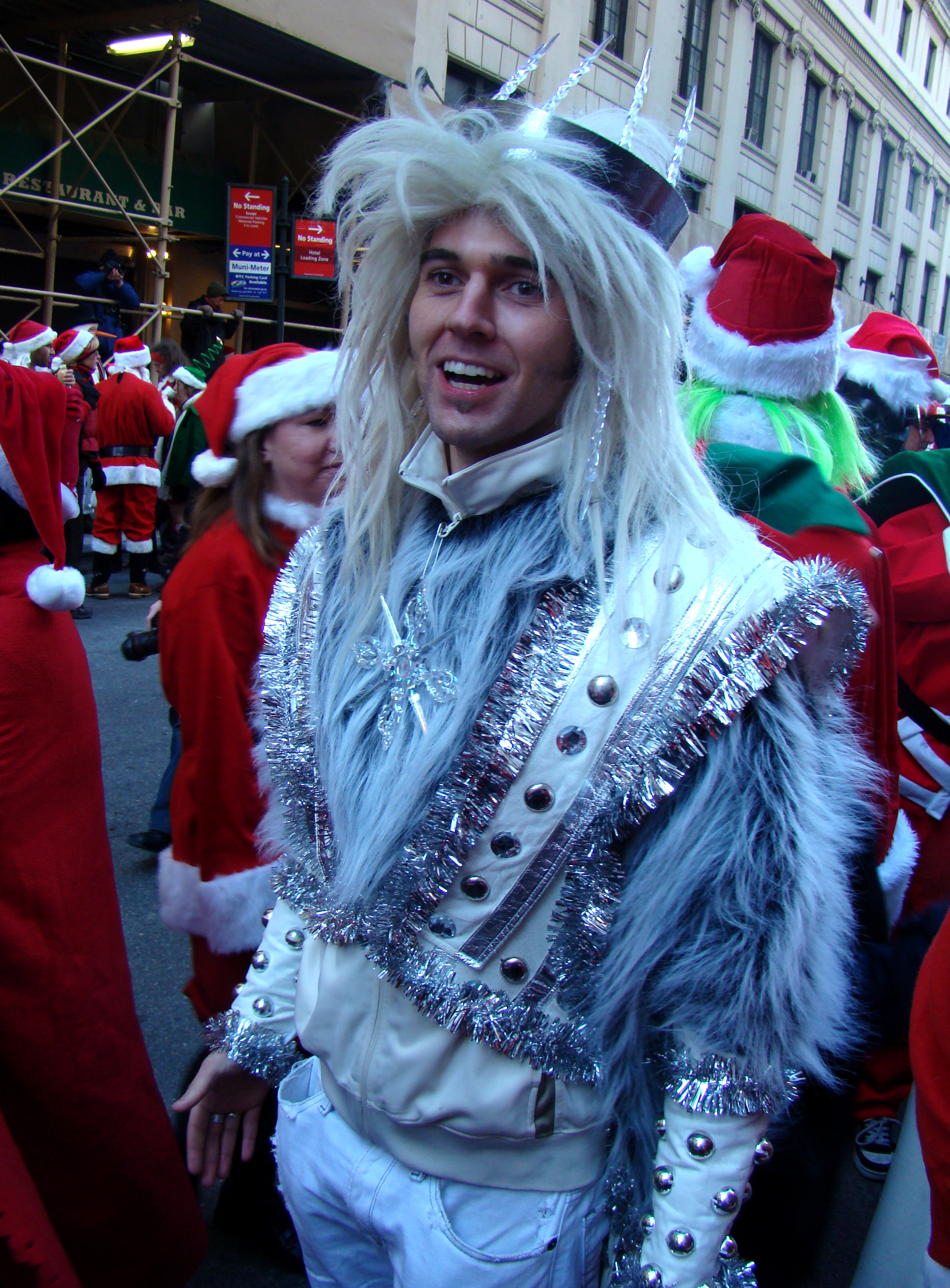
Jack frost (3106502124)

Similar to characters such as Santa Claus, Befana, and Hajji Firuz, who symbolize a particular holiday, there are also figures that resemble the bringing of winter and snow that many cultures associate with the weather. Such characters include Heikki Lunta, Jack Frost, Yuki-onna, Old Man Winter, Snow Queen, and many more. Oftentimes these characters are popular figures in a culture's history, religion, mythology, folklore, and/or literature.

Heikki Lunta, created by David Riutta, is a snow god from Atlantic Mine, Michigan. This Finnish character was originated from a song titled “Heikki Lunta Snowdance Song”, which was created in 1970 to summon snowfall at Range Snowmobile Club's snowmobile race. According to the town, the song created an abundance of snow before the race prompting a second song to be written called “Heikki Lunta Go Away”.

A more recent character personifying snow is Queen Elsa from Walt Disney’s movie Frozen. Elsa, who is based on the main character in Hans Christian Andersen’s The Snow Queen, has the powers to create and manipulate ice and snow. The movie brought in more than $1.2 billion in ticket sales. The booming popularity created a Frozen phenomenon resulting in movie fans blaming snowfall on the animated character of Queen Elsa.

Jack Frost is a common figure associated with frost, snow, sleet, and other weather related extremities. The exact origin of Jack Frost remains unclear with suspicions of Norse and Ango-Saxon history. Jack is mentioned in holiday song “The Christmas Song” and has a presence among movies and wintertime specials including movies ‘’Jack Frost” and “Rise of the Guardians” and television series “A Touch of Frost”.

Characters are major components in contemporary children's books, television shows, songs, movies, and oral tradition.

== Reported Snow Dance success ==
In January 2012, members of the Southern Ute Indian tribe met at Vail Village, in Vail, Colorado, with the hopes of bringing more snow to the nearby mountain. While the members of the tribe began their snow dance ritual, hundreds of people gathered to observe. It was reported that, as the ritual progressed, the snowfall increased. According to the Vail Mountain Marketing Director, the Southern Ute Indian Tribe had also performed a snow dance when the mountain originally opened during 1962. The success of the first snow dance ritual resulted in the second call on the tribe years later.

Similarly, in 2014, a snow dance ritual was performed at the Sugar Pine State Park in Lake Tahoe by the Eagle Wings Native American dancers. According to the executive director of the Sierra State Parks Foundation, snow began to fall, unexpectedly, for only a brief period after the ritual dance was performed.

== See also ==
- Old Man Winter
- Urban legend
- Elsa
- Jack Frost
- Rain dance
- Superstition
