= The Trial of Lee Harvey Oswald (1964 film) =

- Directed by: Larry Buchanan
- Written by: Larry Buchanan
- Produced by: Larry Buchanan
- Starring: George Russell; George Edgley
- Production company: Falcon International
- Release date: 1964
- Country: United States
- Language: English

The Trial of Lee Harvey Oswald is a 1964 American legal drama/historical fiction film directed by Larry Buchanan. It is the first speculative trial drama about Lee Harvey Oswald, the assassin of U.S. President John F. Kennedy and murderer of Dallas police officer J. D. Tippit. Produced in Dallas only a few months after the assassination and Oswald's murder by Jack Ruby, the film attempts to simulate Oswald's trial if he had lived.

== Plot ==
The prosecution asserts that Oswald committed the crime for political reasons based in his Marxist beliefs, while his attorney presents an insanity defense, claiming that he had suffered from untreated paranoid schizophrenia since adolescence. As the viewer acts as a juror, with the judge and attorneys looking straight into the camera and talking directly to the unseen "jury" several times, no verdict is given. Dallas criminal defense attorney Charles W. Tessmer appears after the film to summarize its contents and to encourage viewers to debate among themselves.

== Cast ==
- Charles Mazyrack as Lee Harvey Oswald
- George Edgley as Presiding Judge
- Arthur Nations as Prosecuting Attorney Atkins
- George R. Russell as Defense Attorney Tyler
- Howard Ware as a Bailiff

== Reception ==
In his book Conspiracy Cinema, David Ray Carter describes the movie as a "gimmicky, overwrought" exploitation film.

== See also ==
- Assassination of John F. Kennedy in popular culture
- List of American films of 1964
- The Trial of Lee Harvey Oswald (1977 film)
