= Media Burn Independent Video Archive =

Chicago archive of early video and TV

- Location: Chicago, Illinois, United States
- Type: video archive
- Established: 2003
- Website: Official website

The Media Burn Independent Video Archive preserves the work of early independent videotape and television production. Media Burn holds the largest collection of Louis 'Studs' Terkel video in the world and their 1992 presidential election collection has been deemed an American Treasure. Media Burn digitizes their videos for free online streaming. 1,500 of 6,000 videos are online, and topics range from Chicago history, American politics, mass media, and urban life. Media Burn is located in the River West neighborhood of Chicago, IL.
