= Cadillac Ranch =

Public art installation in Amarillo, Texas, US

Coordinates: 35.187221°N 101.987041°W

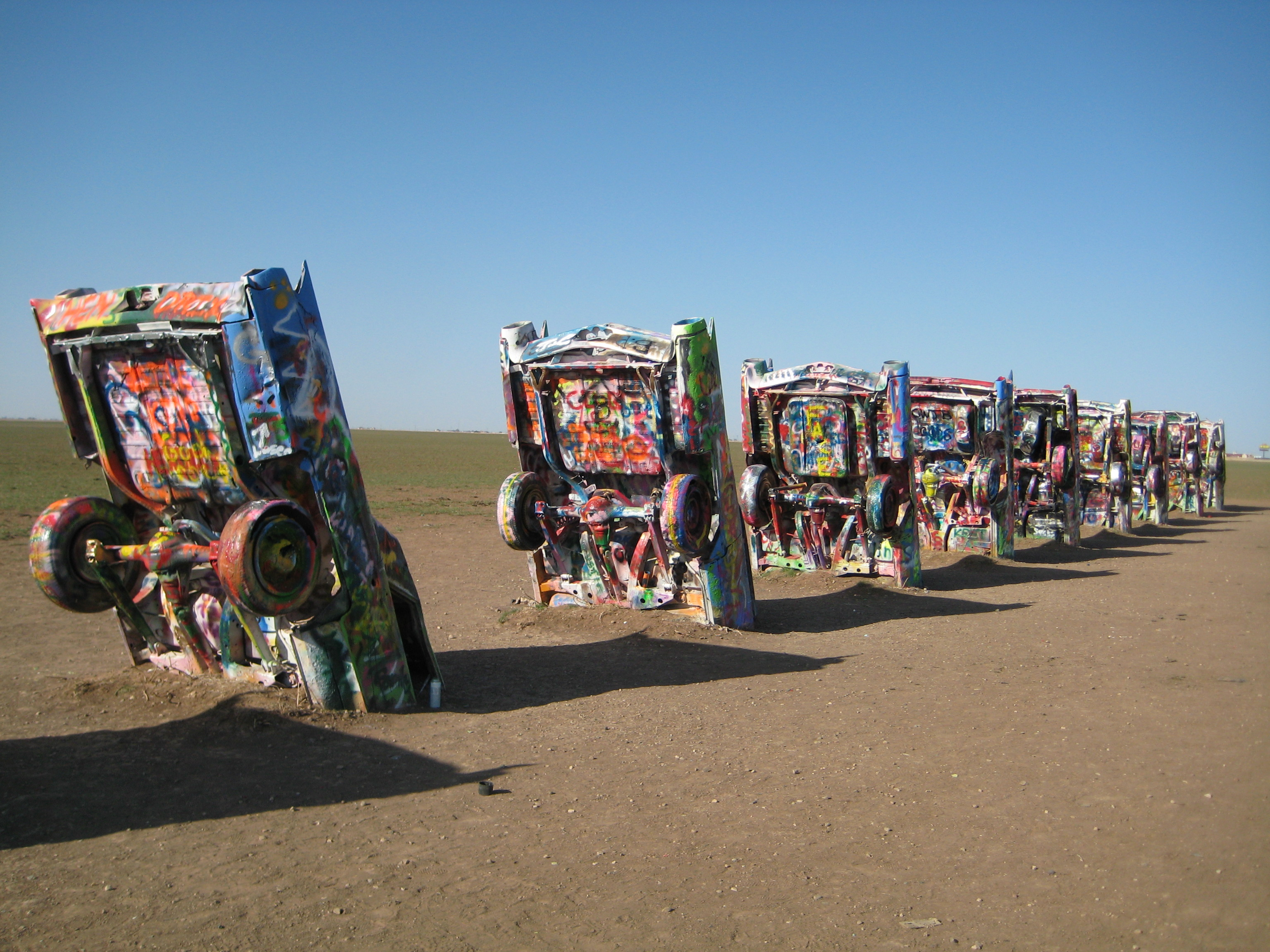
Posterior view of Cadillac Ranch, all in a row in 2008

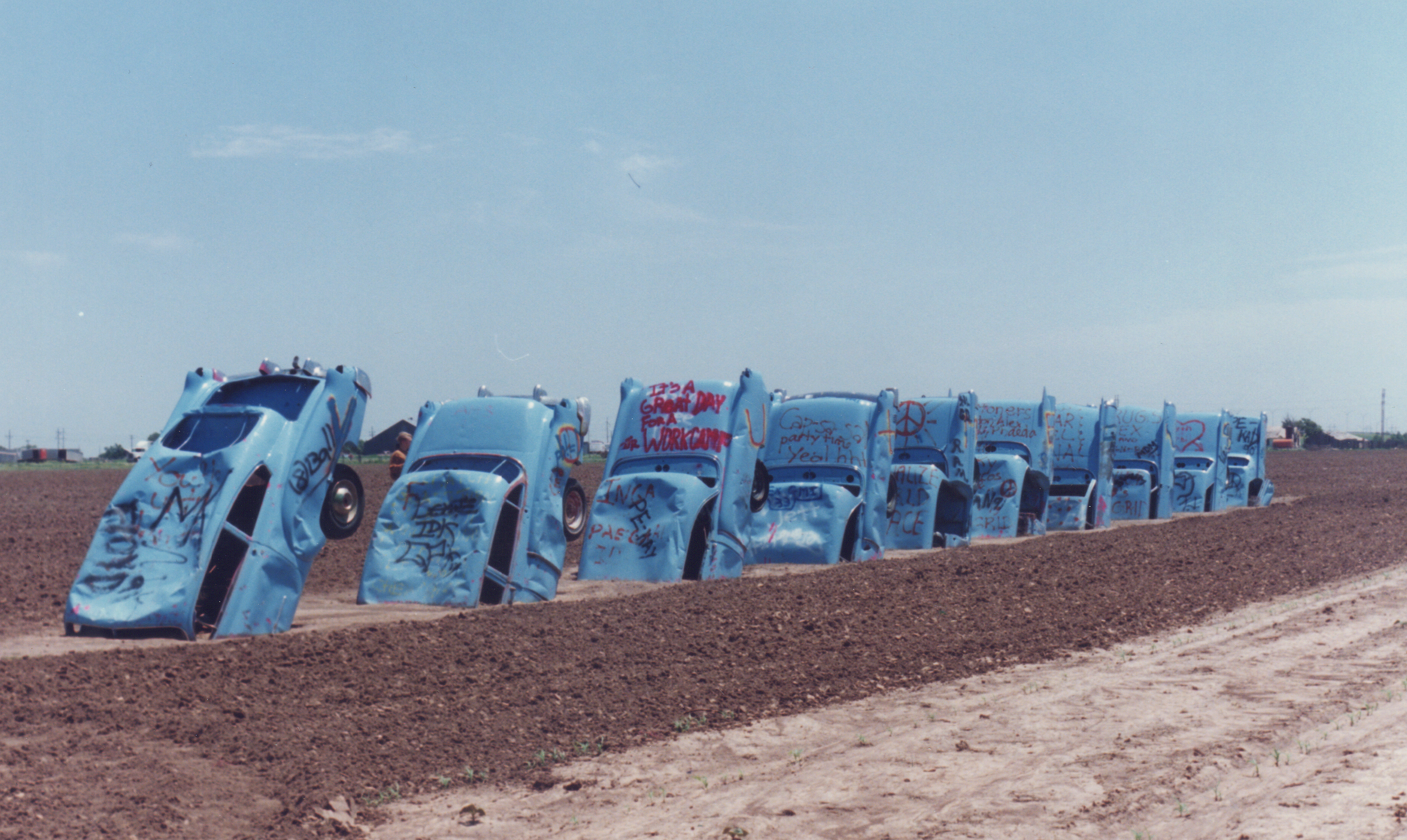
Cadillac Ranch, 1992

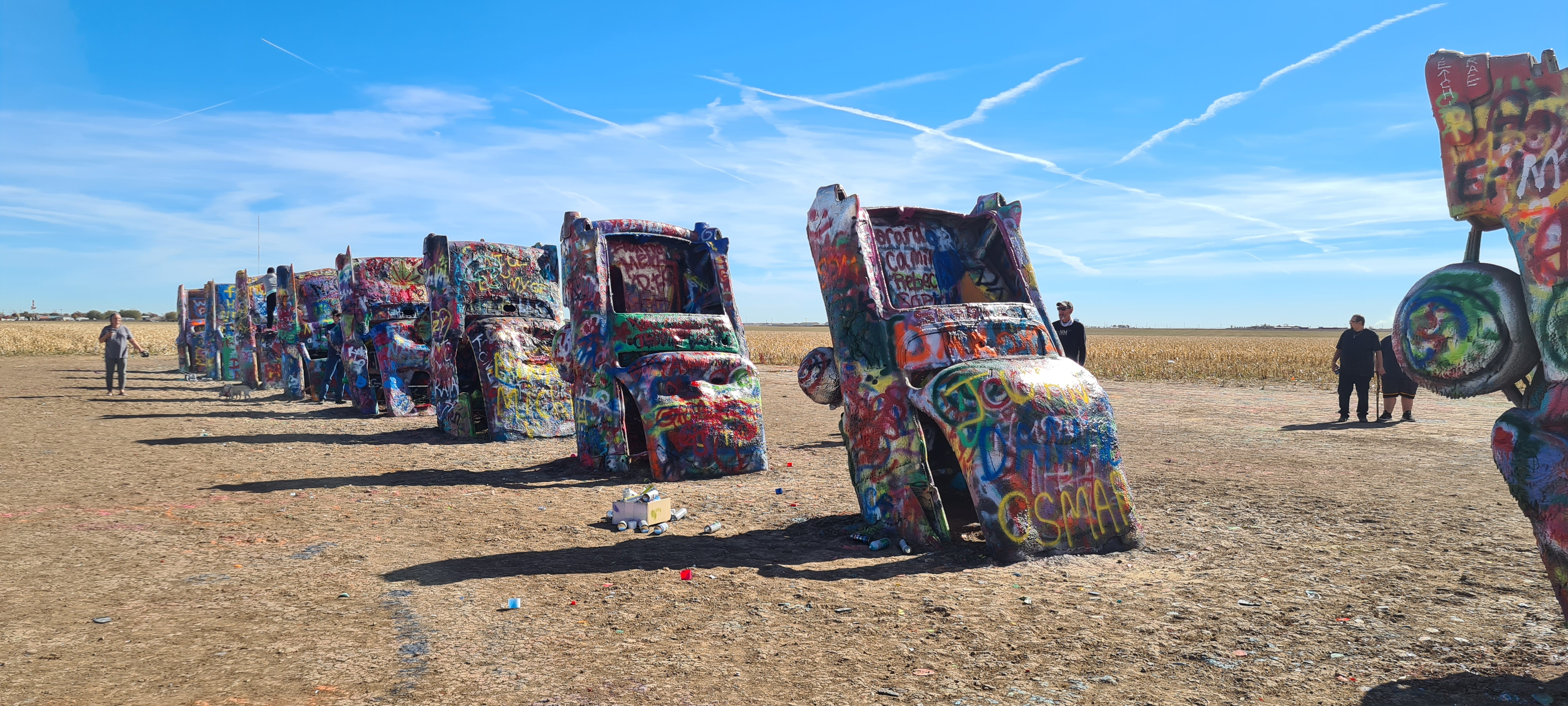
Anterior view of Cadillac Ranch, all in a row in 2021

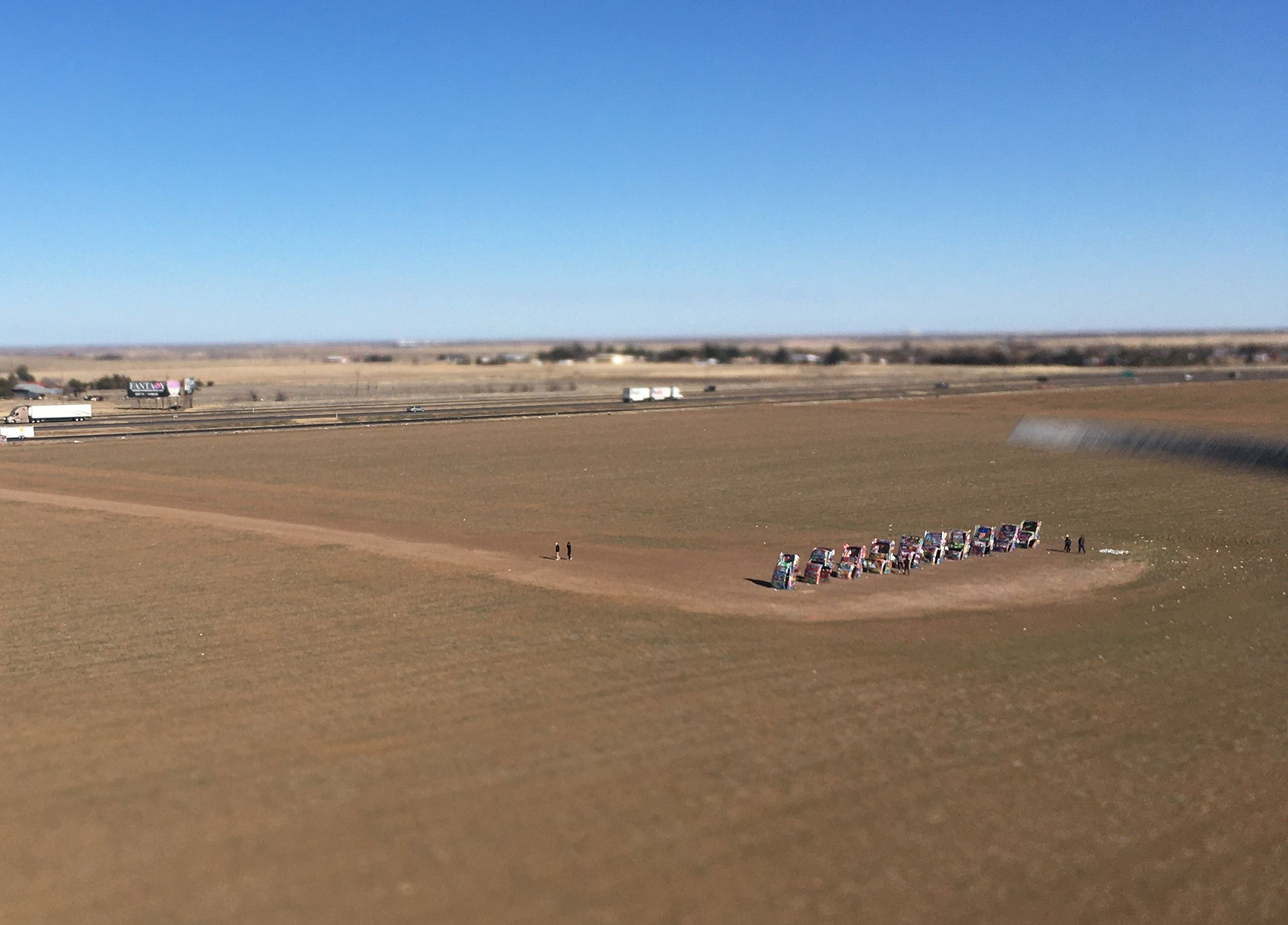
Aerial view of Cadillac Ranch

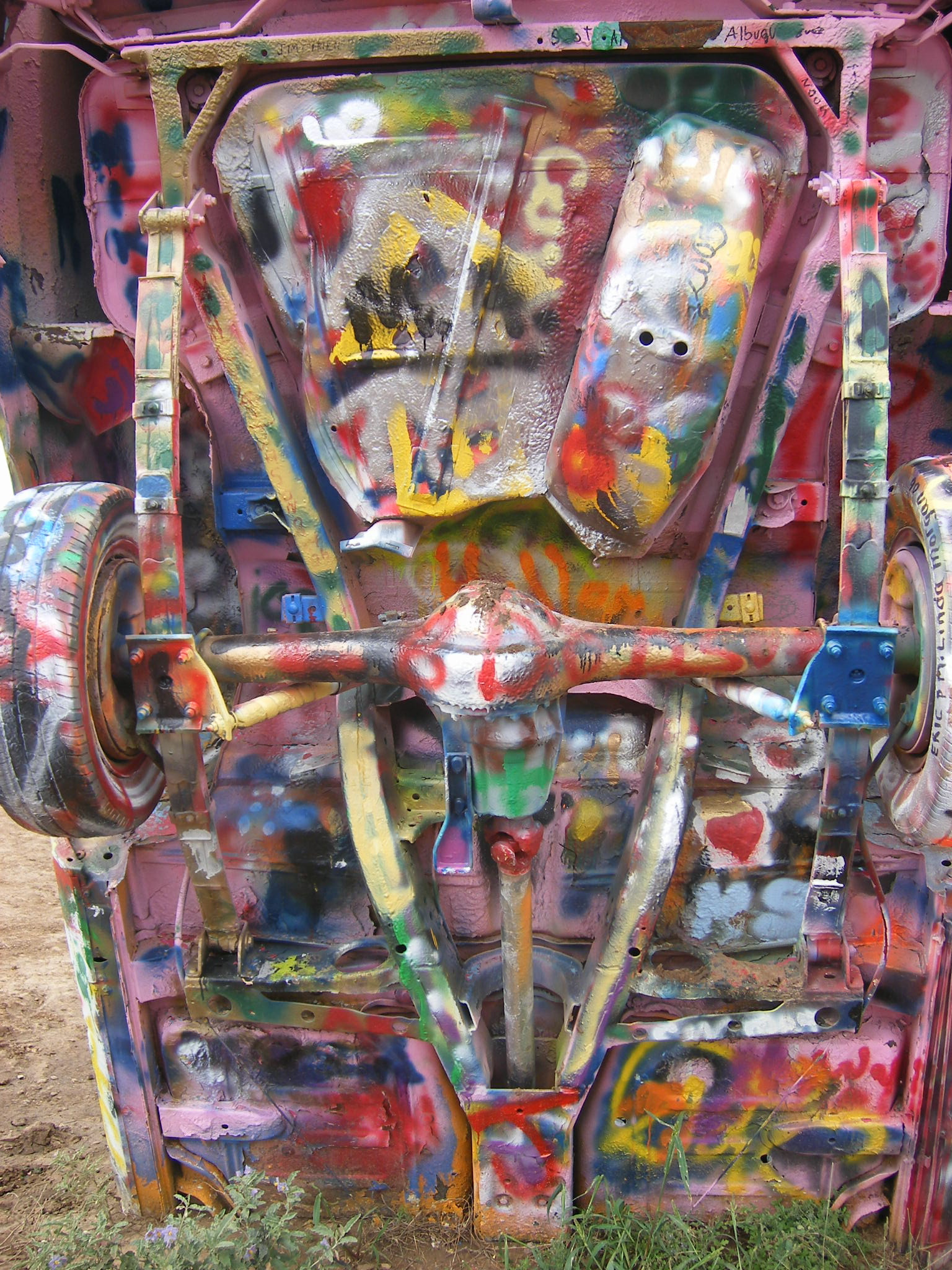
Posterior close up view of a Cadillac

Cadillac Ranch is a public art installation and sculpture in Amarillo, Texas, US. It was created in 1974 by Chip Lord, Hudson Marquez and Doug Michels, who were a part of the art group Ant Farm. The installation consists of a row of ten Cadillacs (1949–1963) buried nose-first in the ground.

Installed in 1974, the Cadillacs were either older running, used or junk cars – together spanning the successive generations of the car line – and the defining evolution of their tailfins. According to Visit Amarillo, the cars are inclined at the same angle as the pyramids of Giza.

== History ==
Chip Lord and Doug Michels were architects; Marquez was an art student at Tulane University in New Orleans, Louisiana. According to Lord, "Ant Farm was founded as an alternative architectural practice, kind of an experiment in an attempt to subvert normal corporate ways of doing architecture."

According to Marquez, "Chip and I were living in the mountains north of San Francisco, and there was a book meant for kids left in a bar near where we lived. It was called 'The Look of Cars,' and there was something on the rise and fall of the tail fin. I didn't have a lot to do, so I just sorta drew it up. I've always loved the Cadillacs."

The group claims to have been given a list of eccentric millionaires in 1972 in San Francisco, identifying Stanley Marsh 3 of Amarillo amongst those who might be able to fund one of their projects and submitted it to him. Marsh's response began "It's going to take me awhile [sic] to get used to the idea of the Cadillac Ranch. I'll answer you by April Fool's Day. It's such an irrelevant and silly proposition that I want to give it all my time and attention so I can make a casual judgment of it."

Between 1 May and 17 May 1974, Stanley Marsh 3--using the name "Leo Wyoming"--began advertising in the Amarillo Globe-Times: "Used Cadillacs Wanted--1948, 1949, 1954, 1957, 1958--Need not be in running condition. We will pay towing. For Cash...Call Leo Wyoming...or write...American Bank Building, Amarillo.".

== Relocation ==
Cadillac Ranch was originally located in a wheat field, but in 1997 the installation was quietly moved by a local contractor to a location two miles (three kilometers) to the west, to a cow pasture along Interstate 40, in order to place it farther from the limits of the growing city. Both sites belonged to Stanley Marsh 3. Marsh was well known in the city for his longtime patronage of artistic endeavors including the Cadillac Ranch; Floating Mesa; Amarillo Ramp, a work by land artist Robert Smithson; and a series of fake traffic signs throughout the city known collectively as the Dynamite Museum. As of 2013, Stanley Marsh 3 did not own the Cadillac Ranch; ownership appears to have been transferred to a family trust some time before his June 2014 death.

Cadillac Ranch is visible from the highway, and though located on private land, visiting it (by driving along a frontage road and entering the pasture by walking through an unlocked gate) is tacitly encouraged. In addition, writing graffiti on or otherwise spray-painting the vehicles is now encouraged, and the vehicles, which have long since lost their original colors, are wildly decorated. Ant Farm artists have encouraged this kind of public interaction with the cars.

The cars are periodically repainted various colors (once white for the filming of a television commercial, another time pink in honor of Stanley's wife Wendy's birthday, and again all 10 cars were painted flat black to mark the passing of Ant Farm artist Doug Michels, or simply to provide a fresh canvas for future visitors). In 2012 they were painted rainbow colors to commemorate LGBT pride week. The cars were briefly "restored" to their original colors by the motel chain Hampton Inn in a public relations-sponsored series of Route 66 landmark restoration projects. The new paint jobs and even the plaque commemorating the project lasted less than 24 hours without fresh graffiti. The cars were painted solid black with the words "Black Lives Matter" in June 2020 to protest police brutality and the murder of George Floyd.

== 2019 fire ==
On September 8, 2019, the oldest of the Cadillacs was reportedly damaged by an arson fire.

== In popular culture ==
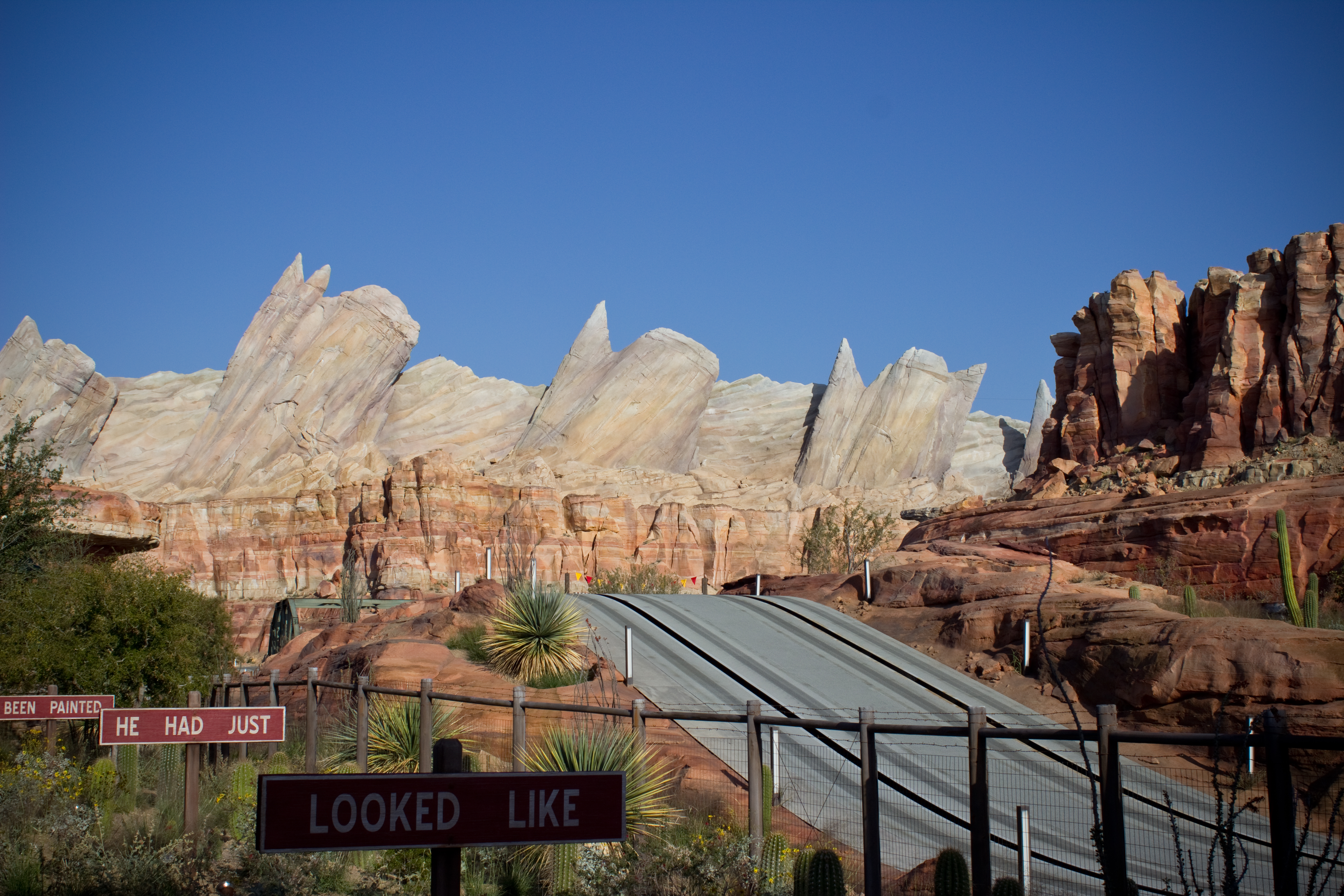
Disney California Adventure's "Cadillac Range"

"Cadillac Ranch" is the name of a Bruce Springsteen song on his 1980 album The River, later covered by the Nitty Gritty Dirt Band and Status Quo.

The music video for the 1985 song "Living in America" by James Brown and the music video for the 2008 song "Ain't No Rest for the Wicked" by Cage the Elephant both feature imagery of the Cadillac Ranch. The Cadillac Ranch is also featured on the cover of singer/songwriter Russell Christian's first EP "Chassis".

In the 1990 book 12 Days on the Road: The Sex Pistols and America, the Sex Pistols pass by Cadillac Ranch on their way to New Mexico during their only American tour. Johnny Rotten sneered and sarcastically described it as "a stirring work."

The 1996 film Cadillac Ranch directed by Lisa Gottlieb and starring Christopher Lloyd and Suzy Amis is set in the Texas Panhandle around its namesake ranch.

Pixar's 2006 animated film Cars depicts a Cadillac Range as a mountain formation; the film's credits directly acknowledge the Ant Farm collective and the Cadillac Ranch. In a case of art-imitating-art-imitating-art, that image from the film Cars has been constructed as a centerpiece of Cars Land at Disney California Adventure.

In the final scene of the King of the Hill episode "Hank Gets Dusted", Hank Hill has his father's Cadillac, which he cherished growing up, pushed front first into a hole along with other Cadillacs to reference the Cadillac Ranch.

Cadillac Ranch serves as the setting for the video for the 2009 song "Honky Tonk Stomp" by country duo Brooks & Dunn, which was the duo's last video.

The band Atomic Tom filmed a video at Cadillac Ranch in November 2011.

In 1992 country music artist Chris LeDoux released a song titled "Cadillac Ranch", written by Chuck Jones and Chris Waters, on his album Whatcha Gonna Do with a Cowboy. It was a duet with Garth Brooks. The song reached #18 on the Billboard Hot Country Singles & Tracks chart and #16 on the Canadian RPM Country Tracks chart.

Book cover artist David Pelham discusses "Jungian Zeitgeist" and other buried 1974 Cadillacs (his cover painting for JG Ballard's novel, The Drought (Penguin edition, 1974) and Neil Young's On the Beach album cover) in a 2012 interview.

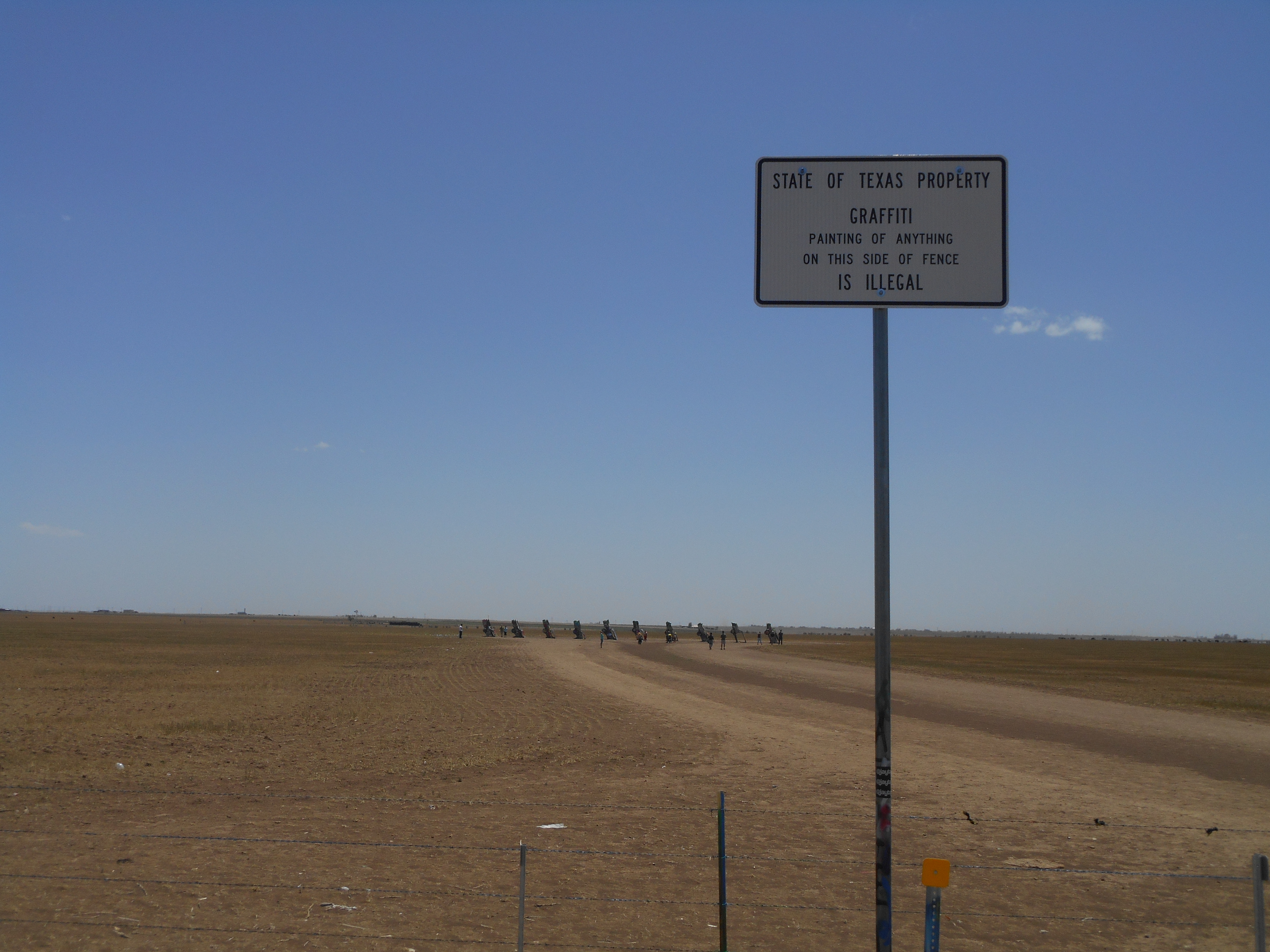
State sign prohibiting graffiti outside of Cadillac Ranch

A scene filmed at the ranch appeared in the 2017 film Bomb City.

In May 2019, photographer/artist George Edward Freeney Jr. photographed the "Cadillac Ranch" inspired by reflecting on his childhood experiences of extending the artistic approach by spray painting on them several times while evading local authorities and his mother in the 1980s, he made "West Texas Street Painter" and "West Texas Street Painted", limited edition imagery.

In August 2020, singer Rihanna took an "art" selfie at the Cadillac Ranch, alongside a message on a car showing disapproval for Donald Trump.

== 50th anniversary ==
In June 2024, to mark the installation’s 50th anniversary, Ant Farm co-founder Chip Lord led a repainting of the cars in gray primer as a celebratory "reset." The repaint coincided with the museum exhibition Cadillac Ranch at 50, featuring historic photographs by Wyatt McSpadden alongside video works and ephemera from Lord; the show ran June–August 2024. In October 2024, the Amarillo Symphony premiered Cadillac Ranch, an orchestral work by composer Michael Daugherty commissioned for the site’s 50th anniversary and the orchestra’s centennial.

== See also ==
- Carhenge
- Spindle (sculpture)
