= John Pleshette =

American actor and screenwriter (born 1942)

- Education: Brown University
- Occupations: Actor, screenwriter
- Years active: 1964–present
- Relatives: Suzanne Pleshette (cousin)

John Pleshette is an American actor and screenwriter, best known for his role as Richard Avery on the television drama Knots Landing, and for portraying Lee Harvey Oswald in the TV movie The Trial of Lee Harvey Oswald. Pleshette also wrote several scripts for Knots Landing in the 1980s.

== Career ==
In a television acting career spanning decades, Pleshette has appeared in such shows as The Rockford Files; Highway to Heaven; Kojak; Magnum P.I.; Simon & Simon; Murder, She Wrote; MacGyver; Beauty and the Beast; L.A. Law; The Larry Sanders Show; Dr. Quinn, Medicine Woman; ER; NYPD Blue; The Sopranos; Law & Order: LA; and Curb Your Enthusiasm.

Pleshette played Lee Harvey Oswald in the television film The Trial of Lee Harvey Oswald (1977), and appeared in the TV miniseries Seventh Avenue the same year. In 1979, he was cast in the role of Richard Avery on Knots Landing. Series creator David Jacobs was acquainted with Pleshette's work, and Pleshette was married to literary agent Lynn Pleshette, Jacobs' ex-wife. Pleshette appeared on Knots Landing for four seasons (1979–83), and returned briefly in 1987. During the 1980s, he wrote several scripts for the series.

Pleshette also appeared in the Blake Edwards comedy S.O.B. (1981), and Micki & Maude (1984). He appeared in the episode 'The Judas Bug" of the ABC crime drama The Feather and Father Gang in 1977, and in MacGyver in the Season Two episode "D.O.A.: MacGyver".

== Personal life ==
Pleshette is Jewish; his grandfather changed his surname from Kravitz to Pleshet when he immigrated to pre-state Palestine, adding the "te" later. He is a cousin of the late actress Suzanne Pleshette. He graduated from Brown University in 1964.

== Filmography ==
=== Film ===
Year	Title	Role	Notes
1970	End of the Road	Finkle	
1972	Parades	Murray	
1972	The Irish Whiskey Rebellion	Kinch	
1978	House Calls	Theatrical agent	
1979	Rocky II	Director	
1981	S.O.B.	Capitol Studios Vice-president	
1984	Micki & Maude	Hap Ludlow	
1988	Paramedics	Doctor Lido	
1990	Vietnam, Texas	Harold	
1993	Eye of the Stranger	Joe	
1995	Born to Be Wild	Donald Carr	
1997	The Curse of Inferno	Mr. Wizzard	
1998	The Truman Show	Network Executive	
2003	Detonator	Stuart Newman	
2003	The Failures	Principal Holbrook	
2007	Sex and Breakfast	Older Man in Elevator	
2009	Gentlemen Broncos	Merve	
2016	The Wandering Day	C S Longacre	Direct-to-video

=== Television ===
Year	Title	Role	Notes
1964	The Patty Duke Show	Pete	Episode: "Simon Says"
1967	Coronet Blue	Dan	Episode: "Faces"
1973	The Doctors	Joe Hilligan	Episode #1.2607
1974	Kojak	Resident	Episode: "You Can't Tell a Hurt Man How to Holler"
1975–1976	Doctors' Hospital	Dr. Danvers	6 episodes
1976	Mary Hartman, Mary Hartman	Hugh Boswell	9 episodes
1976	Bell, Book and Candle	Nicky	Television film
1977	Seventh Avenue	Marty Cass	3 episodes
1977	The Hardy Boys/Nancy Drew Mysteries	Carl Fry	Episode: "The Flickering Torch Mystery"
1977	The Feather and Father Gang	Schecter	Episode: "The Judas Bug"
1977	The Trial of Lee Harvey Oswald	Lee Harvey Oswald	Television film
1978	The Users	Kip Nathan	Television film
1978	The Rockford Files	Danny Green / Julius 'Jay' Rockfelt	2 episodes
1979–1987	Knots Landing	Richard Avery	77 episodes
1980	Once Upon a Family	Willie Hedges	Television film
1980	Tenspeed and Brown Shoe	Bill Kingman	Episode: "The Robin Tucker's Roseland Roof and Ballroom Murder"
1982	The Kid with the Broken Halo	Jeff McNulty	Television film
1983	Whiz Kids	Richard Chapman	Episode: "Red Star Rising"
1984	Burning Rage	Frank Vandenberg	Television film
1984, 1986	Simon & Simon	Dr. John Ashfield / Attorney Dorsey Pender	2 episodes
1985	MacGruder and Loud	Malcolm Skeat	Episode: "Pilot"
1985	Magnum, P.I.	Steve Elliot	Episode: "Compulsion"
1985	Stormin' Home	Al Singer	Television film
1985	Malice in Wonderland	Tommy Gallep	Television film
1986	Welcome Home, Bobby	John Hammill	Television film
1986	Mrs. Delafield Wants to Marry	David Elias	Television film
1986	Murder, She Wrote	Nicky Saperstein	Episode: "Stage Struck"
1987	MacGyver	Lancer / Benson	Episode: "D. O. A.: MacGyver"
1987, 1988	Highway to Heaven	Stanley / Charley Trapola	2 episodes
1988	Windmills of the Gods	Eddie	2 episodes
1988	Shattered Innocence	Mel Erman	Television film
1990	Murder in Paradise	Wagner Thorne	Television film
1990	Hunter	Ron Nieman	Episode: "Final Confession"
1990	Beauty and the Beast	Jimmy Faber	2 episodes
1990, 1991	L.A. Law	Mark Kumpel	2 episodes
1991	Deadly Game	Television film	Television film
1991–1993	Civil Wars	Al Noonan	4 episodes
1992	The Wonder Years	Charlie Barrett	2 episodes
1993	Bloodlines: Murder in the Family	Neil Woodman	Television film
1993	The Larry Sanders Show	Leo	Episode: "Larry's Agent"
1993	Percy & Thunder	Bill Slocum	Television film
1994	Dr. Quinn, Medicine Woman	Detective Simpson	2 episodes
1994, 1995	Lois & Clark: The New Adventures of Superman	Dr. Emil Hamilton	2 episodes
1995–1997	Murder One	Gary Blondo	15 episodes
1996	Diagnosis: Murder	Dr. John Foster	Episode: "Murder in the Dark"
1996	The Sentinel	Brother Christopher	Episode: "Vow of Silence"
1997	Party of Five	Professor Conklin	Episode: "I Declare"
1997	ER	Stuart	Episode: "Ambush"
1997	Murder One: Diary of a Serial Killer	Gary Blondo	6 episodes
1998	The Pretender	Sean Flanagan	Episode: "A Stand-Up Guy"
1998	The Practice	Attorney Nick Jamison	Episode: "Trees in the Forest"
1998	The Day Lincoln Was Shot	William H. Seward	Television film
1998	Mike Hammer, Private Eye	Augustus Hancock "Auggie" Sterling II	2 episodes
1998	Arliss	Orson	Episode: "My Job Is to Get Jobs"
1999	G vs E	Wallace Augur	Episode: "Cliffhanger"
2001	NYPD Blue	Gerald Holzman, Esq.	Episode: "Thumb Enchanted Evening"
2001	James Dean	Billy Rose	Television film
2001	Curb Your Enthusiasm	Therapist	Episode: "The Thong"
2002	For the People	Dr. Goodwin	Episode: "Come Blow Your Whistle"
2004	The Sopranos	Dr. Ira Fried	Episode: "All Happy Families"
2004	Helter Skelter	Mr. Krenwikle	Television film
2004	JAG	Prosecutor Joe Wilson	Episode: "Camp Delta"
2005	NCIS	Tom Crawley	Episode: "Model Behavior"
2006, 2007	The Nine	Mr. Kates	2 episodes
2008	Eli Stone	Judge Nettles	Episode: "Two Ministers"
2010	Kosher Pig	Paul Cohen	Television film
2011	Law & Order: LA	Judge	Episode: "Reseda"
2012	American Horror Story: Asylum	Committee Chairman	Episode: "The Coat Hanger"
2013	Happily Divorced	Rabbi	Episode: "I Object!"
2013	Mistresses	Judge Kavanaugh	Episode: "When One Door Closes..."
