= The Trial of Lee Harvey Oswald (1977 film) =

- Film poster
- Genre: Drama
- Written by: Robert E. Thompson
- Directed by: David Greene
- Starring: Ben Gazzara; Lorne Greene; Mo Malone; John Pleshette
- Music by: Fred Karlin
- Country of origin: United States
- Original language: English

Production
- Executive producer: Charles Fries
- Producer: Richard Freed
- Production locations: McKinney Square, McKinney, Texas; Dealey Plaza - 500 Main Street, Dallas, Texas
- Cinematography: Vilis Lapenieks
- Editor: Allan Jacobs
- Running time: 210 minutes
- Production company: Charles Fries Productions Inc.

Original release
- Network: ABC
- Release: September 30, 1977

The Trial of Lee Harvey Oswald is an American two-part television film shown on ABC in September 1977. The film stars Ben Gazzara, Lorne Greene and John Pleshette in the title role. It is an example of alternate history. The film explores a scenario where Lee Harvey Oswald was not killed by Jack Ruby and stands trial for the murder of President John F. Kennedy.

== Synopsis ==
The film opens sometime in 1964 and Oswald is in a maximum security cage as a radio announcer tells how he has been on trial for the last 43 days as the eyes of the entire world watch. A bailiff announces the jury has reached a verdict and the world press rushes to their phones. Oswald is handcuffed and led back into the courtroom to learn his fate.

The film then flashes back to the day before the Kennedy assassination. Oswald is trying to reconcile with his estranged wife Marina without luck. The next day, a friend drives him to the Texas School Book Depository and he puts a wrapped package in the backseat. The assassination of Kennedy is then reenacted with chilling conviction. Oswald leaves the building and possibly murders police officer J. D. Tippit. Oswald is arrested in a theater and bound over for trial. Oswald's prosecutor is wily, sarcastic Anson "Kip" Roberts (Gazzara). From the beginning, Roberts is skeptical about a "poor shlub who couldn't even hold a job" assassinating the President. However, a phone call from President Johnson himself makes him realize he had better stick to this hypothesis. In the meantime, bombastic defense attorney Matt Weldon (Greene) is assigned to the defense. He realizes he has a difficult client upon their first meeting when Oswald keeps talking in paranoid fashion about "them" and "they" manipulating the strings. In addition, Weldon has to deal with several cases of possible witnesses for the defense dying under suspicious circumstances.

A change of venue moves the "trial of the century" to a small Texas town. Roberts and Weldon square off before a stern judge who immediately lets them know who is in charge of the courtroom. Weldon conducts a formidable defense in the beginning casting doubt on the testimony of eyewitnesses. He and his investigators interview Oswald's wife and mother and associates to try to obtain a clearer picture of "the man of mystery". However, the picture only grows darker as flashbacks show Oswald defecting to the Soviet Union, returning to the US and in the company of various shady individuals. Oswald stubbornly refuses to cooperate when Weldon urges him to open up and tell the truth, as it might help save him from the electric chair. Although Lee insists on taking the stand in his own defense, he mysteriously refuses to talk when Weldon presses him. Roberts begins his cross-examination by asking Oswald why there is a picture of him with a rifle, a palmprint of his on the murder weapon and a money order buying the Mannlicher-Carcano which killed Kennedy. Oswald merely says the evidence is faked. The prosecutor applies an unusual method of cross-examination by mentioning an argument Oswald and Marina had the night before the assassination when Marina wanted to watch JFK on TV and Lee kept turning the set off over and over. Roberts demands "Isn't that why you decided to kill President John F. Kennedy, because Marina wanted to watch him on TV?" In his only display of emotion during the trial, Oswald screams a denial. When Roberts points this out, Oswald responds that any person would react that way if someone pries into their personal lives.

The film then ends as it began with the prisoner being led back into the courtroom. Dallas Police Detective Jim Leavelle made a brief cameo appearance playing himself in this scene. Oswald is then shot and killed by Ruby in an eerie return to reality. It flashes on the screen that the makers of the film cannot provide the role of a jury and the final verdict is the viewers'.

== Cast ==
- Ben Gazzara as Anson "Kip" Roberts
- Lorne Greene as Matthew Arnold Weldon
- Frances Lee McCain as Jan Holder
- Lawrence Pressman as Paul Ewbank
- Charlie Robinson as Melvin Johnson
- George Wyner as Ed Blandings
- Mo Malone as Marina Oswald
- John Pleshette as Lee Harvey Oswald
- Marisa Pavan as Evita Alesio
- Jack Collins as Judge Claymore

=== Featuring (alphabetically) ===
- Ed Abry
- Jeff Alexander
- David Beidelman
- Maggie Burns
- Burke Byrnes
- John Chappell
- Charles Cyphers as Michael Brandon
- Desmond Dhooge
- Joe Edwards
- John Gage
- John Galt
- Tony Garrett
- Ellen Geer
- Buddy Gilbert as Harry Cabot
- Robert Ginnaven
- Joe Griffith
- James Harrell
- Susan Heldfond
- Harlan Jordan
- William Jordan as James Kleist
- Elsie Julian
- Hugh Lampman
- Ray Le Pere
- Don McCord
- Billy Dan Millikan
- Jaki Morrison
- Peyton Park
- Robert Phalen
- William Phipps as Captain Will Fritz
- Jack Rader
- Alex Rodine
- Eddie Thomas
- Bill Thurman
- Annabelle Weenick as Marguerite Oswald
- Billy Vance White
- Bill Woods

Uncredited

- G. D. Spradlin as Doctor providing witness testimony

== Reviews ==
In a critical review for The Washington Post, Tom Shales wrote that the film "is beyond reprehensible as a piece of entertainment" and called it a "sorry charade".

== See also ==
- Assassination of John F. Kennedy in popular culture
- The Trial of Lee Harvey Oswald (1964 film)
