= Stand for Something: The Battle for America's Soul =

2006 book by John Kasich

- Authors: John Kasich
- Language: English
- Subject: Politics of the United States
- Genre: non-fiction
- Publisher: Warner Books
- Publication date: 2006
- Publication place: United States
- Pages: 244
- ISBN: 9780446578417
- OCLC: 62324923

Stand for Something: The Battle for America's Soul is a 2006 book by the American politician John Kasich.

== Summary ==
In Stand for Something, Kasich argues that America can recover its shared values of personal responsibility, honesty, accountability and integrity if each of us acts to "set right the moral pendulum in our own lives."

Kasich criticizes politicians who are more interested in getting reelected than in serving the public good. Among the political leaders he admires for pursuing the public good are civil rights activist Martin Luther King Jr. and presidents Franklin D. Roosevelt and Ronald Reagan, each of whom he views as inspiring people "to do better in their own lives."

The book includes descriptions of his working-class childhood in McKees Rocks, Pennsylvania, the son of a letter carrier. He discloses to his readers that although he served as an altar boy in his childhood parish, he liked girls "too much" to seriously contemplate entering the priesthood.
