= Kathy Rae Huffman =

American curator, writer, producer, researcher

Kathy Rae Huffman is an American curator, writer, producer, researcher, lecturer, and expert for video and media art. Since the early 1980s, Huffman is said to have helped establish video and new media art, online and interactive art, installation and performance art in the visual arts world. She has curated, written about, and coordinated events for numerous international art institutes, consulted and juried for festivals and alternative arts organisations. Huffman not only introduced video and digital computer art to museum exhibitions, she also pioneered tirelessly to bring television channels and video artists together, in order to show video artworks on TV. From the early 1990s until 2014, Huffman was based in Europe, and embraced early net art and interactive online environments, a curatorial practice that continues. In 1997, she co-founded the Faces mailing list and online community for women working with art, gender and technology. Till today, Huffman is working in the US, in Canada and in Europe.

== Education ==
Huffman received an MFA in Exhibition Design (with distinction) from the School of Fine Art, California State University, Long Beach (CSULB) in 1979 under the supervision of Stacy Dukes, with a second major in Radio/Film/Television. She also completed a two-year postgraduate certificate program in Gallery and Museum Studies from CSULB, under the guidance of Constance Glenn, in 1980. She holds a Life Membership Awarded, Phi Kappa Phi honor society.

As an art student in the 1970s, Huffman supported herself with a part-time job as 'staff artist' for the Long Beach Public Library system, one of the first institutions to acquire portable video equipment. She used the Sony Portapak to document library events. To learn more about video and its potential as a tool for artmaking, she joined the Museum Studies course at CSULB. Huffman met the video artist Bill Viola in 1976 and began to work in collaboration with him on his ambitious project, the interactive video and sound installation Olfaction. It was presented at the final group exhibition 'Beyond the Artists' Hand' for the Museum Studies course. Olfaction worked perfectly for the entire exhibition; since then, Huffman has tried to match that level of achievement for every show she curated.

In 1977, then deputy director at the Long Beach Museum of Art (LBMA), David Ross, invited Huffman to complete her 6-month professional internship, the final requirement of the CSULB Museum Studies course. From 1977 till 1979, Huffman was Video Coordinator for the Los Angeles-based non-profit organization "Some Serious Business, Inc" (directed by Nancy Drew, Susan Martin, and Elizabeth Freeman), and she managed numerous video screening events and Southern California cable television series in collaboration with the LBMA, like the artists program 'Made for TV', organized by 'The Kitchen' (New York City). In 1978, Huffman was assistant curator and exhibition designer for Streamline Moderne, a survey of household objects, vehicles, and graphic design of the 1930s and 1940s. Curator was Stacy Dukes at the CSULB Art Gallery. In 1979, Huffman coordinated Picturephone Performance, a live performance by Nam June Paik and numerous invited artists, between Los Angeles and New York.

== Professional practice ==
=== Long Beach Museum of Art, 1979 - 1984 ===
Huffman was appointed Chief Curator at the Long Beach Museum of Art in Long Beach, California in late 1979, after she had served one year as the Video Coordinator for curator Nancy Drew. Under her direction, she established LBMA Video as a regional media art center, with fundraising for a multimedia workshop and broadcast quality post-production facility for artists at a former (and unused) police precinct in Belmont Shore (a hip, young Long Beach community). This media art center included technical services, video editing studios, a videotape and media art library, production equipment for loan, a performance space, exhibition program, and a visiting artist programme. LBMA Video collaborated with the local cable TV station to produce and present artists on TV, and operated an open-door policy, allowing artists from around the world to use its facility. Huffman curated and produced several media art installations in the LBMA, including installations by Gary Hill, Bill Viola, Eleanor Antin, Dara Birnbaum, Laurie Anderson, Ant Farm, Nan Hoover. Exhibitions curated and produced by Huffman (selection):

==== Hole in Space ====
Huffman curated and produced the exhibition Hole in Space at the LBMA in 1980, a groundbreaking live communication sculpture by Kit Galloway and Sherrie Rabinowitz (K&S). Hole in Space was the first public video chat, linking large displays on public squares in New York and Los Angeles with a satellite feed. This engineering prototype illustrated K&S's vision of large screen teleconferencing.

==== California video ====
As US Commissioner at the Paris Biennial, and curator of a survey of new video from California, Huffman presented the exhibition California Video as the American Selection in the Musée d'Art Moderne de la Ville de Paris, 1980. The exhibition toured (with a catalog) through 1982.

==== The Artist and Television ====
Huffman was the West Coast segment producer for the live 3-hour television event The Artist and Television, initiated by Jaime Davidovich. It was a live interactive teleconference that took place in Iowa City, Los Angeles, and New York City in October 1982. Artists, curators, critics and performers in all three cities interacted with each other via satellite, conducting interviews and presenting live art and musical performances. The event was broadcast nationwide through the American Television and Communications Corporation and ACSN (The Learning Channel). The issues discussed included video as an art medium and the accessibility of broadcast television for artists. The event was produced as a collaboration of the Long Beach Museum of Art, the University of California (Los Angeles), and the University of Iowa. One of the most successful projects, where artists could try out live performance from three points for the first time ever: Atari is the New Parent, by John Sturgeon.

==== The Artist and the Computer ====
Curator of the first west coast survey of the use of computers in artmaking, including workshops, demonstrations, lectures and performances at the Long Beach Museum of Art, and collaborating institutions California State University Long Beach, and University of Southern California, January–February 1983. It was a pioneering overview of how computers were utilized in various media (video, sculpture, printmaking, photography, installation, performance and drawing).

==== At Home: Ten Years of Feminist Art in Southern California ====
A retrospective of Womanhouse artists, October 1983. Huffman was event coordinator for the regional Los Angeles county initiative to celebrate the 10-year anniversary of Womanhouse (since 1972) and the founding of the Southern California feminist movement. More than fifty institutions or groups participated in the month-long calendar of events. Huffman also coordinated and co-curated Haunted Womanhouse, a feminist performance festival on the Long Beach Museum of Art grounds, and was co-curator, with Lyn Blumenthal, of the video exhibition Roles Relationships and Sexuality.

==== Shared Realities ====
Executive producer of the Long Beach Museum of Art's cable television series, including interviews, artists' videotapes, and special projects. Huffman initiated the statewide conference called Shared Realities, held in Long Beach, aboard the Queen Mary, 1983.

=== Institute of Contemporary Art (ICA) Boston / The CAT Fund ===
1984-1991, Huffman was Adjunct Curator at the Institute of Contemporary Art, Boston, Massachusetts. The ICA was Boston's premiere educational and exhibition space for contemporary art. As adjunct curator, Huffman contributed exhibition concepts, community projects, and collaborations with local, regional and national media organizations.

Huffman was appointed curator/producer of The Contemporary Art Television Fund / The CAT Fund, a pilot project of the Institute of Contemporary Art, Boston and WGBH-TV's New Television Workshop, Boston's public television station, with a mandate to create a context for artists to define television as a medium for their personal expression. Funded initially by the Massachusetts Art Council, The CAT Fund was designed to play an active role in the development of artists' TV internationally.

Compared to Southern California, the East Coast seemed to Huffman more theoretical and political. The ICA Boston (directed by David Ross) was a very studious environment. Beside this stronger intellectual inspiration, Huffman had the opportunity to be more involved with artists working with digital processes. She commissioned one of Bill Seaman's early interactive computer works and presented exhibitions using digital technology. Artists commissioned for 'The CAT Fund' included (among others): Laurie Anderson, Bill Viola, Tony Oursler, Constance DeJong, Joan Jonas, Dara Birnbaum, Raul Ruiz, Marcel Odenbach, Bill Seaman, Daniel Reeves, Ken Feingold, Chip Lord, Doug Hall, Ilene Segalove, William Wegman and Michael Smith.

==== The Arts for Television ====
A major touring exhibition, commissioned by MOCA in Los Angeles. Huffman was co-curator with Dorine Mignot, Stedelijk Museum Amsterdam, and Julie Lazar, Museum of Contemporary Art (MOCA) Los Angeles, of the first museum survey to examine television as a form and forum for the contemporary arts. The exhibition premiered simultaneously in the Netherlands and the United States in 1987, and traveled to more than one dozen institutions in Europe and North America in 1988 and 1989.

==== TIME CODE ====
Huffman was series initiator and US producer of the international television magazine TIME CODE, a non-verbal artists collaboration, co-produced with Channel 4 (UK), RTBF (Belgium), NOS (Netherlands), TVE (Spain) and ZDF (Germany). The series continued until 1990, with various countries coordinating the submissions and international broadcast schedule. Program one, Sense of Place, included TIME SQUARED by Branda Miller, 1987.

==== Deconstruction, Quotation and Subversion: Video from Yugoslavia ====
Huffman was guest curator for this show at Artists Space in New York City, 1989. The exhibition was presented at Artists Space and the ICA in Boston.

==== VGTV - All America Tour ====
Boston Residency for Van Gogh TV and tour coordinator for VGTV presentations in San Francisco, Los Angeles, Seattle, Vancouver, Philadelphia, Omaha, and New York City. The tour began with a live 4-hour interactive broadcast event in Boston from Continental Cable Television, January 1991.

=== Freelance Curatorial Projects and Productions 1991-1998 ===
1991 - 1998, Huffman worked as a free-lance writer, curator, lecturer, producer, and consultant, based in Austria. During this time, Huffman researched new areas of contemporary art, became invested in the internet in the early 1990s, travelled extensively throughout East and Central Europe, lectured at art schools, and presented film and video art program selections at numerous international festivals. She was a regular contributor to the Ars Electronica festival in Linz, taught at the Academy of Fine Arts Vienna, and lectured at the Freie Klasse, University of Applied Arts Vienna.

==== Women, Myth and Sexuality ====
Curator for the special video program at the EMAF European Media Art Festival, Osnabrück, 1990. Also shown in Boston, Vienna, Ljubljana, and Zagreb in 1991.

==== Ars Electronica Festival Out of Control ====
Huffman curated a video survey called Video: Violence (the series was purchased by Spanish Television for national broadcast on Metropolis, the monthly culture program, 1991) and the film program Richard Kern: Retrospective, for the Ars Electronica Festival Out of Control in Linz 1991.

==== Piazza Virtuale ====
International coordinator of Piazzettas, with Mike Hentz, for live television project of Van Gogh TV, the 100-day project at the DOCUMENTA IX, Kassel. Coordination included 6 months of travel to remote locations to organize participating artist groups, and residence in Kassel during the DOCUMENTA IX, to coordinate the daily Piazzetta broadcast schedule over 3SAT (broadcast to the entire European footprint of the Astra satellite), January - September 1992.

==== New Media Topia ====
1993-1994, Huffman was consultant for the Soros Center for Contemporary Arts in Moscow. New Media Topia was the first media art exhibition held at Central House of Artists, Moscow.

==== New Media Logia ====
Huffman was International Symposium Coordinator for this symposium, held in November 1994. She invited and integrated one dozen international media experts into the first Russian new media exhibition, including international theoreticians Lev Manovich, Geert Lovink and Alla Mitrofanova; artists Michael Naimark, George Legrady, Michael Bielicky and Alexi Shulgin; and Art TV producer Maria Pallier.

==== SCCA Network ====
1993-1995, Huffman was Contemporary Arts and Media Consultant for the Open Society Institute and the Soros Centers for Contemporary Arts SCCA Network. As a media art specialist and communicator, her responsibilities included travel with Suzanne Mészöly (director of SCCA Network, Budapest, Hungary) to develop exchange projects between the newly formed east situated SCCA regional centers. During these early years of national independence from Soviet domination, nationalism and an eye towards the West were predominant in East European countries, which made them targets of exploitation. The SCCA's energy was directed towards building skills, technical connectivity, and self-confidence to work collaboratively with other East European centers, as well as with Western media organizations and individuals.

==== Art and Politics ====
A screening and discussion at the Landesgalerie Linz (now called Francisco Carolinum), Austria, showing videos from the east and west that used political content - works by Americans working with Paper Tiger Television and Russian artists produced by Tatiano Didenko, Moscow State TV, which were screened side by side, in 1994. This screening project developed into Checkpoint 95, a major performance event at Ars Electronica 1995.

==== Intelligent Ambience ====
Co-curator with Carole Ann Klonarides for a video program that revealed the in between of architecture and electronic space, for the Ars Electronica festival in Linz, Austria, May 1994.

==== A Past Memorized / A Future Conceived: Video from Slovenia ====
Curator of video survey exhibition, commissioned by the Rotterdam Arts Council, Netherlands. Presented in Amsterdam, Rotterdam, Graz, Munich, and Ljubljana, 1994-1995.

==== Word Up! ====
Curator for a selection of artists' literary CD-ROM and hypertext projects, for Vienna's annual Literature Festival Word Up! in the Museumquartier, May 1995.

==== Checkpoint 95 - Live TV and Telepresence ====
Checkpoint 95 - Live TV and Telepresence was an international initiative and concept by Huffman: a live broadcast event between Moscow, New York City, and Linz, as opening performance of the Ars Electronica festival Wired World in Linz, Austria, 1995. Produced by Stadtwerkstatt Linz, Russian State Television Moscow, and Paper Tiger Television New York. Checkpoint 95 - Live TV and Telepresence showed three programs by the studios Stadtwerkstatt TV Linz, Studio ATR Moscow, and BMCC Media Center New York City, taking place simultaneously, linked by satellite and broadcast in Europe, Asia and North America via 3sat, Channel 2 of the Russian State Television Company, Deep Dish Satellite TV Network and Manhattan Cable.

==== Fractal Flesh ====
International event coordinator for the performance artist Stelarc, at his premiere performance of this remote online system that allowed 10 remote online connections to choreograph his body during two, six-hour "live" internet performances, at 'Telepolis: The Digital and Networked City' exhibition, November 1995.

==== HILUS intermediale Projektforschung ====
1995 and 1996, Huffman was a researcher-in-residence and a member of the HILUS cooperative in Vienna. Huffman made her personal library of media books, journals, festival and exhibition catalogues (and over 1000 artists video titles) available to the Austrian research community, artists, and visiting curators. A grant from the Ministry of Culture, Austria, provided programming assistance to compile a data base of this collection. In January 1997, HILUS was disbanded, and the HILUS / Huffman media archive was loaned to C3 (Center for Communication and Culture) Budapest, for one year.

==== CyberSpaces: Encountering the Digital Environment ====
A program of video art about virtual spaces, internet and interactive television, for the Telepolis conference in November 1995 in Luxembourg. Huffman was curator of a three-part video series for the exhibition Telepolis: The Interactive and Networked City. Each one hour program was installed in, and played throughout the exhibition. Program sections: Artists Envision Cyberspace; Cyber-experiments for Television, and the 1995 BBC 8-part TV series The Net.

==== Info-Coctails ====
Curator and co-organizer with Thomas Brandstetter of a monthly multi-media theme event series at the HILUS office, to promote archive use, and the info-associations between video, various print media, CD ROMS, and internet resources. At each event, websites were bookmarked, books, journals and videos selected from the archive. Topics included: Digests of Diana (Princess Diana); Bad Grrls; Oblivion Seekers: Hypertext Hysteria; and Czech Neighbors in Brno. Summer 1996.

==== Online Encounters – Intimacy and E~motion ====
A multimedia performance lecture / demo-presentation at the Dutch Electronic Art Festival (D.E.A.F.), V2 in Rotterdam, September 1996, by Huffman, with participants (who presented from internet stations in the audience): Stahl Stenslie, V.R. developer and artist (NO), Nick West, interactive television developer, NYU (USA), Julia Meltzer & Amanda Ramos, artists (USA), and Gereon Schmitz, interactive project coordinator for Clubnetz, Internationale Stadt Berlin (DE).

==== Telepolis Newsroom ====
Huffman was event coordinator and team journalist for a one-week experimental online newsroom, to report on the European Media Art Festival EMAF in Osnabruck, Germany, September 1996.

==== Dar~Links ====
Dar~Links in 1996 was one of the first online exhibitions, a one year long show on the Ars Electronica Center Server, Linz, Austria. It was curated by Huffman, and consisted of a new work presented monthly, a total of 10 websites by female artists. The idea of Dar~Links was to profile art websites by women working in different styles, countries and concerns. Huffman considered the websites by women the most interesting.

==== Digital Care ====
Digital Care, at the Galerie Cult, Vienna, in November 1996, featured three sites in three weeks: Glasgow, St. Petersburg, Bilbao. Each week, artists‘ internet works (print versions) and cultural information from the internet were installed (and gathered during visits). A recipe - provided by individuals via e-mail correspondence - was cooked and served in the gallery to guests at each opening performance/reception.

==== Virtual World Orchestra ====
Regional information coordinator for NVA organization, Glasgow. An international sound and communication performance event for the internet, online and on-location at the Old Fruitmarket in Glasgow, April 1997.

==== I Like America - America Likes Me ====
An exhibition and performance event by Eva Wohlgemuth and Huffman, in collaboration with Hungarian artist Szacsva y Pál. It took place at the Studio Gallery, Budapest, Hungary, in association with the Budapest Spring Festival, May 1997.

==== Zones of Disturbance (Zonen der Ver-Störung) ====
Curator of 10 internet and 10 CD-ROM projects included in the international exhibition at Marieninstitut, part of Steirischer Herbst, Graz, Austria, October 1997. Chief curator: Silvia Eiblmayr.

==== Web 3D-Art ====
Initially called VRML-Art, but later changed to Web3D-Art, this first juried competition was co-organized in collaboration with Karel Dudesek (1997–2003). Web3D Art was the official art show for the Web3D – VRML 2000 Symposium, the 5th International Conference on 3D Web Technology in Tempe, Arizona, and the Siggraph Art Show in 2000. It was sponsored by ACM Siggraph and the Web3D Consortium, presented as an installation, part of the Siggraph Art Show, New Orleans, in 2000.

==== [e]-dentity: Female Perspectives on Identity in Digital Environments ====
Curated by Huffman, [e]-dentity was a touring video programme and is a DVD collection, distributed by Video Data Bank, School of the Art Institute, Chicago. It contains videoworks created 1982-2000 that explore the cyber environment and how it affects, expands, confuses, and involves female identity.

=== Collaborative and (online) communication projects ===
==== Siberian Deal ====
In this project, Huffman acted as a net activist and net artist. Siberian Deal, 1995, was a real travel and virtual internet artwork with Eva Wohlgemuth, which examined the value of objects in post-communist society. During their journey through Siberia, Wohlgemuth and Huffman filled their online cyber diary (today we would call it a weblog) with digital images, videos and text. The journey was a challenging adventure, on the physical and on the technical level, while the internet connection broke down regularly. Their audience interacted and accompanied them by email. Siberian Deal received the first prize for Interactive Art at the VideoFest Berlin 1996 (now media art festival Transmediale). In the same year, it was presented at the Next 5 Minutes (n5m) conference in Amsterdam. The original travel report isn't online anymore. The website was featured in numerous festivals and exhibitions, and a text by Paoli Bianchi was included in the Kunstforum International special issue II of the Art of Travel, Spring 1997. The multi-media analysis and review of the trading of objects during travels in Siberia isn't online anymore.

==== Face Settings ====
The second collaborative internet artwork with Eva Wohlgemuth, 1996-1998: A project of internet communication and of cooking meetings in various international cities between women in remote European regions. Women working in various artistic and scientific disciplines met in Russia, Serbia, Spain (Basque), the United Kingdom (Scotland) and Austria. They were united in a common net strategy regionally, for information exchange, theoretical development, and artistic expression. The project initiated a female-only mailing list of media specialists of more than 100 women from twenty countries.

==== Pop~TARTS ====
1996-1997, Huffman was co-author with Margarete Jahrmann (a multimedia artist from Vienna) of a regular column for the Telepolis Magazine of Net Culture, sponsored by Heise Verlag, Hannover, the largest German language publisher of technical journals (IX, CT). As teleworkers, Pop~TARTS developed a palaver type of writing, in a series of informative topics, events, and interactions, in German and English. Texts were built-up jointly, by filtering the enormous data-flow on the internet from a female perspective, and inviting reader participation. Huffman and Jahrmann looked for intersections between theory and practice of websites with a focus on women and communications projects. It started as a multimedia column with a lot of involvement by other women and generated a huge amount of data. After trying out several concepts for its structure, Pop~TARTS became a more straightforward platform for texts on events and certain topics Huffman and Jahrmann chose.

'Face Settings' and 'Pop~TARTS' were projects to build up networks and online communities, mainly among women in the media arts and media theory, and brought together offline and online communication. The mailing list and online community Faces, established in 1997, resulted after Face Settings as the online forum for women.

=== Teaching and academic lectures 1995-1997 ===
Huffman has been a guest lecturer on media art and internet art issues, in educational institutions in the following countries: Finland, Norway, Sweden, Italy, France, Germany, Luxembourg, Croatia, Slovenia, Serbia, Brazil, Chile, Argentina, Spain, Poland, Holland, Canada, Japan, Romania, Macedonia, Russia, and throughout the United States.

Her first work about women in media was a lecture called Cyberintimacy at the Vilém Flusser Symposium in Munich in October 1995, which was a collection of information and media works - mainly by women commenting on their internet communication experiences.

Video from Russia, a guest lecture for the classes of Nan Hoover and Nam June Paik at Kunstakademie Düsseldorf, Germany, November 1995.

East European Media Art, guest lecture at Rensselaer Polytechnic Institute, iEAR (Integrated Electronic Arts at Rensselaer) studio program, Spring 1996.

Interactive & Online Art / TV History, guest lecture for professors Joachim Blank and Paul Sermon, Hochschule für Grafik und Buchkunst (HGB), Leipzig, Germany, May 1996.

Frauen und Medien semester course co-taught with Dr. Silvia Eiblmayr, Akademie der Bildenden Künste, Wien, Winter 1996 / 1997.

Women Myth and Sexuality: a female history of video art, guest professor, semester course at Akademie der Bildenden Künste, Wien, Vienna, October 1996 - January 1997.

Interactive Television, Art, and Internet, a week-long intensive workshop, Mertz Akademie Stuttgart, January 1997.

American Video Art Strategies, a weekend workshop at the Freie Klasse, Hochschule für Angewandte Kunst, Wien, Vienna, Austria, February 1997.

Women Online, guest lecture for professor Ardele Lister, media course at Rutgers, New Jersey, April 1997.

Video, Artists Television, and New Media Art, six lecture screenings at C3 (Center for Communication and Culture), Budapest, Hungary, during May 1997.

Cyber Intimacy: Strategies, Tactics and Communication Practices lecture and workshop at Hochschule für Bildende Künste, Braunschweig, Germany, for Professor Birgit Hein (filmmaker), June 1997.

Media Art Strategies in the 1980s and 1990s, lectures for Meeting Point Seminar, Soros Center for Contemporary Arts, Sarajevo, Bosnia, July 1997.

=== Panels and presentations 1996-1998 ===
Tactical Curating, panel discussion, chaired by Chris Hill, at Next 5 Minutes festival for tactical media, Amsterdam, 1996.

Reflections on Media Art, opening statements for symposium, moderator for artists discussion at Electra 96, Oslo, Norway, April 1996.

Interactive Internet Projects, moderator for artists discussion, D.E.A.F. 96, V2 Rotterdam, November 1996.

Face Settings (with Eva Wohlgemuth), at Anti With-E, at Backspace (Heath Bunthing's Secret Conference), London, January 1997.

Face Settings workshop and presentation (with Eva Wohlgemuth), at TRANSMEDIA Festival, Berlin, April 1997.

Virtual Worlds: New Frontiers, moderator of panel discussion at V2, featuring Van Gogh TV, and Dutch initiatives in 2D & 3D world design and community building, April 1997.

Face Settings: a collaborative woman's online project (with Eva Wohlgemuth) at Video Positive, Liverpool, April 1997.

Sex In Space: Grrls in Electronic and multi-media, at SYNEMA symposium, Vienna, organized by Marie Luise Angerer, May 1997.

Pop~TARTS: Collaborative Online Text Writing (with Margarete Jahrmann), opening presentation at CYBERCONF 5, Oslo, Norway, June 1997.

Online Workshop for Women (with Eva Wohlgemuth), at Kunsthaus Bethanian, Berlin, July 1997.

Community, Content, Interface: Creative Online Journalism, panel presentation of female e-zines and Pop~TARTS, at Siggraph 1997, chaired by Mark Tribe, Rhizome Online, with Gary Wolfe, Hotwired; Lev Manovich, UCSD; and Armin Medosch, Telepolis, August 1997.

Bodyscan & Internet Projects, Eva Wohlgemuth and Huffman, in conversation with Dr. Sabine Folie at The Depot, Museumquartier, Vienna, October 1997.

Artists Interactive Television, presentation and text of the unique history of artists' contributions to TV and Internet TV, since the 1960s, at Interfiction 5, Kassel, Germany, November 1997.

On-line Installation Artworks, panel participation at College Art Association, Toronto (panel chairs Peggy Gale & Barbara London), February 1998.

=== Rensselaer Polytechnic Institute ===
1998 - 2000, Huffman was associate professor at the Arts Department, Rensselaer Polytechnic Institute in Troy, New York. She led the Bachelor of Science Program EMAC (Electronic Media Art and Communication), a joint program of the Art Department and the Department of Language, Literature and Communication, and was advisor for 250 EMAC students specializing in Digital Art and Communication. She maintained the EMAC website and moderated the EMAC student mailing list. She initiated the artist in residence program Van Gogh TV (1999) and an ArtsLink placement for Danica Dakić (2000).

=== Hull Time Based Arts ===
2000 - 2002, Huffman was the director of Hull Time Based Arts in Hull (Yorkshire, UK). She directed the regional artist-led media centre, the annual ROOT (Running Out Of Time) sound and performance art festival, artists commissions, collaborative productions and touring. Managing the whole institution including exhibition space and a technical artists' production and post production access facility, she also worked with the team to develop educational and training programmes, including the WAM! (women in media) project, which was created to train young single mothers, and hosted artists in residence (EMARE European Media Artists in Residence Exchange). Hull Time Based Arts was closed in 2009. The EMARE residencies program is still active.

=== Cornerhouse Manchester, UK ===
2002 - 2008, Huffman was Visual Arts Director at Cornerhouse in Manchester. She was responsible for the visual arts exhibition and events programme for Cornerhouse, Greater Manchester's international centre for contemporary art, including artists' residencies, touring exhibitions, commissions and publications. Her curatorial work included new media exhibitions that utilised digital film, internet, sound and video art, like the following exhibitions: What do you want? (works by five female Indian artists for the Asian Triennial Manchester 08) and Broadcast Yourself (co-curated with Sarah Cook for the AV Festival Newcastle) in 2008; Outside the Box and Central Asian Project (with Julia Sorokina and Anna Harding) in 2007; Nick Crowe: Commemorative Glass in 2006; Marcel Odenbach: The Idea of Africa and Eva Wohlgemuth's Bodyscan: Instandstillness in 2005; Zineb Sedira: Telling stories with differences (2004); and Grace Weir: A Fine Line (2003), Lab3D: The Dimensionalised Internet, Balkan Matrix and Where do we go from here?. Cornerhouse also hosted Urban Screens Manchester, an international conference and media art in public space event in 2007, in collaboration with BBC Big Screens. For this she presented a companion exhibition, and managed the BBC Big Screen in Manchester.

==== Selected exhibitions ====
IRWIN: Like to Like, exhibition, commission, Cornerhouse Manchester, 2004.

[Prologue] New Feminism / New Europe, co-curator: Eva Ursprung, exhibition, performance series, conference, Cornerhouse Manchester, 2005.

TV Art, an independent project for The Getty Museum: In 2008, Huffman was invited to write a text for the catalog and to present an evening at The Getty Museum in the framework of the exhibition California Video: Artists and Histories (curated by Glenn Phillips, 2008). The comprehensive public program that accompanied the exhibition was always sold out. In her presentation TV Art, Huffman screened works that offered an aesthetic commentary inspired and influenced by television; all were broadcast in the 1970s and 1980s. The screening included works by Ante Bozanich, Nancy Buchanan, Chris Burden, John Duncan, Doug Hall, Ilene Segalove, Mitchell Syrop, Bruce and Norman Yonemoto, and others.

Broadcast Yourself: Artists' interventions into television and strategies for self-broadcasting, Cornerhouse Manchester, 2008.

Central Asian Project, Cornerhouse Manchester, 2007-2008.

Masaki Fujihata: The Conquest of Imperfection. A mid-career retrospective of interactive installations, with catalog, Cornerhouse Manchester, 2008.

=== Curatorial projects and public events since 2009 ===
==== Transitland: Video Art from Central and Eastern Europe 1980-2009 ====
Huffman was collaborating curator 2008-2010 with InterSpace, Sofia, Bulgaria. The exhibition Transitland: Video Art from Central and Eastern Europe 1980-2009 at InterSpace, in partnership with Transmediale, Berlin, and ACAX, Ludwig Museum, Budapest, was a collaborative archiving project. Its main outcome is a selection of 100 single-channel video works, produced in the period 1989-2009 and reflecting the transformations in post-socialist Central and Eastern Europe. Transitland was presented in 2009 at the Transmediale new media festival in Berlin, and 2010 at Reina Sofia Museum in Madrid.

==== ISEA 2009 ====
Huffman was curator for the international exhibition of the ISEA 2009 conference in Belfast, Northern Ireland, UK. Venues: Golden Thread Gallery, Ormeau Baths Gallery, and the University of Ulster, Belfast campus. Exhibition of 65 artists, working with technology, interactive, online and performance art.

==== Exchange and Evolution: Worldwide Video Long Beach 1974-1999 ====
As Lead Curator (guest curator) at the Long Beach Museum of Art, 2009–2011, Huffman curated this exhibition as part of the initiative Pacific Standard Time: Art in L.A., 1945-1980, coordinated by The Getty Foundation, 2011-2012.

==== 25 years EMAF European Media Art Festival Osnabrück ====
Presentation at EMAF European Media Art Festival in Osnabruck, Germany, 2012. For the last 20 years, Huffman has participated in EMAF on a regular basis; as a curator, producer, online journalist, networker, presenter and organiser.

==== Curating and the Archive ====
A research project and lecture workshop tour in Croatia by Huffman, September 2012, at the Museum of Contemporary Art, Zagreb, the Museum of Contemporary Art Rejika, and the Museum of Contemporary Art, Pula. This project was arranged by the artist Sandro Dukic and Branka Cvjetičanin who runs the cultural center Polygon, with funds from the Croatian Ministry of Culture.

==== Presentations of the work of Nan Hoover ====
In 2013, Huffman gave major presentations of the work of Nan Hoover: In the context of the exhibition re.act.feminism #2 - a performing archive at Akademie der Künste, Berlin, and as part of Innsbruck International Festival of the Arts in Innsbruck, Austria.

==== The Supershow ====
Huffman curated this exhibition of 42 artists who have studied with Professor Günther Selichar in his class mass media research und Kunst im medialen öffentlichen Raum at the Academy of Visual Arts Leipzig, Germany. Presented at Halle 14, Spinnerei, Leipzig, and the HGB Gallery, 2013.

==== Chip Lord in conversation with Kathy Huffman ====
Chip Lord (co-founder of Ant Farm) in conversation with Huffman at the symposium Video Trajectories, NBK Berlin, Feb. 2014.

==== Curator for ikono TV ====
2013: Profile of Marcel Odenbach's 1990s television works, as part of: ikono On Air Festival, September 2013. In 2015, Huffman curated media art for ikono TV's video art project ART SPEAKS OUT. This long video art program is also screened within the exhibition Till It's Gone at Istanbul Modern in 2016.

==== Video Art (1970-1990): Works from the Long Beach Museum of Art archive ====
Getty Research Institute, The Broome Gallery, California State University, Channel Islands, USA, 2015.

==== Enhanced Vision – Digital Video ====
Huffman curated this online video exhibition, presented by the Digital Arts Community, ACM Siggraph, 2015-2016.

==== Isolated Landscapes: Video by Prairie Women (1984-2009) ====
This exhibition in 2017 at Video Pool Media Arts Centre in Winnipeg, Manitoba, Canada, curated by Huffman, is the overview of the historic video work of women working in the Prairies. In 2016, Huffman dedicated months of work to the experimental video archives at Video Pool, researching thousands of tapes in various technical formats. The video works from the exhibition are also available to be watched online, for a limited time, at Vucavu.ca, a Canadian online distribution service, operated by the non profit Coalition of Canadian Independent Media Art Distributors (CCIMAD).

== Publications and texts ==
=== Selected journals, anthologies, exhibition catalogs (reverse chronology) ===
Audio interview with Huffman about her exhibition Video Art 1970-1990. The Long Beach Museum of Art Video Archive at the Getty Research Institute, 2015. Interviews from Yale University Radio WYBCX, Sep. 2015.

Marcel Odenbach: What's TV Got To Do With It?, pages 37–60, in Take it or Leave It: Marcel Odenbach (Anthology of Texts and Videos), edited by Slavko Kacunko and Yvonne Spielmann, eva – edition video art 2, Logos Verlag, Berlin, 2013. Exchange and Evolution: Worldwide Video Long Beach 1974-1999. Huffman, lead curator, and Nancy Buchanan, co-curator. Long Beach Museum of Art, 2011.

Video Art from Central and Eastern Europe in the Transitland Archive, pages 229-244, in Transitland: video art from Central and Eastern Europe, 1989 – 2009, edited by Edit Andres, Ludwig Museum – Museum of Contemporary Art, Budapest, 2009.

ISEA 2009: 15th International Symposium on Electronic Art, Island of Ireland. Huffman, as curator for the international art show at the ISEA 2009 conference, edited the publication / catalog.

Video Life: Ko Nakajima and Kentaro Taki, text for exhibition catalog, St. Paul Gallery, Auckland, Australia, 2011.

Masaki Fujihata: The Conquest of Imperfection, exhibition catalog, Cornerhouse, Manchester, 2008.

Nick Crowe: Commemorative Glass, exhibition catalog, editor and foreword, Cornerhouse, Manchester, 2007.

Face Settings: an International Co-cooking and Communication Project by Eva Wohlgemuth and Kathy Rae Huffman in Women, Art and Technology, edited by Judy Malloy, Cambridge MA, The MIT Press, 2003.

Grace Weir: A Fine Line, exhibition catalog / DVD, editor and foreword, Cornerhouse, Manchester, 2003.

Balkan Matrix by Mihael Milunovic an Stevan Vukovic, exhibition catalog / DVD, editor and foreword, Cornerhouse, Manchester, 2003. Fe-Mail: Data_Set, special multimedia Pop~FEATURE, with Margarete Jahrmann, for Telepolis online journal, 1997. The Disturbed Zones of Internet Art, in exhibition catalog Zonen der Ver-Störung / Zones of Disturbance, edited by Silvia Eiblmayr, steirischer herbst, Graz, 1997.

Sex, History and (sub) Culture: a reconsideration, essay on the work of Marina Grzinic and Aina Smid, for the Art*Int*Act journal and CD ROM publication, edited by Astrid Sommer, ZKM, Karlsruhe, 1997.

Bionically Connected: Rena Tangens and Padeluun, for Rhizome Online, August 1997, and Springer Hefte für Gegenwartskunst, Vienna, October 1997.

Micronations: Virtuelle Territorien und Kuenstlerstaaten (with Margarete Jahrmann), in Telepolis Print Quarterly No.2, editors Armin Medosch und Florian Roetzer, Bollman Verlag, June 1997 (in German).

The Siberian Deal Experience: Writing for the Internet, special issue of Electronic Book Review dedicated to postmodern writing in Eastern Europe, edited by Vladislava Gordic, July 1997.

Virtual World Orchestra: Clubscene with Content, special pop~EVENT report in Telepolis, April 1997.

Geeks erobern den Weltraum, in Freitag Journal of Netculture, edited by Andreas Broeckmann and Pit Schultz, Zeitungsverlag Freitag, Berlin, April 1997. In German; posted on Nettime in English.

The Siberian Deal, in Kursive No. 4 - Der wilde Osten (1). A quarterly journal about communication and culture, edited by Peter Assmann and Gottfried Hattinger, Oberösterreichischer Landesverlag, Linz, Austria, 1997. In German.

The Electronic Arts Community Goes Online: A Personal View, in 'Talkback!' online journal, edited by Robert Atkins, January 1997.

Anti With-E at Backspace, in the Austrian art journal 'Springer Hefte für Gegenwartskunst', Vienna, April 1997. In German.

Pop~TARTS (1996-1997), a regular column for the Telepolis Magazine of Net Culture, sponsored by Heise Verlag, Hannover, the largest German-language publisher of technical journals (IX, CT).

dar~LINKs, an online catalogue with introductory text for each of 10 websites by women, chosen monthly for the Ars Electronica Center Server, March - December 1996.

Cyberfeminists IRL and Online, a special pop~FEATURE on VNS Matrix & Gashgirl, multimedia online text with Margarete Jahrmann, Telepolis, September 1996.

Art, Video and Television: Contradictions? in New Media Topia, exhibition catalogue edited by Irina Alpatova, Soros Center for Contemporary Arts, Moscow, 1996. In Russian and English.

Video Networks and Architecture: Some Physical Realities of Electronic Space, in Electronic Culture, anthology edited by Timothy Druckrey, Aperture, 1996.

Breathing Fresh Norwegian Air into Cyberspace, in HyperPhoto, Oslo, 1996. In Norwegian.

Cyber Intimacy: From Net Nookie to Coffee Talk, text for festival website transcribed from lecture for Interfiction 3, Festival of Media Art Dok- und Videofest Kassel, Germany, December 1995.

The Cold War - (TV) Lessons from the Past for the Future, for Checkpoint 95, in Wired World, Ars Electronica festival catalogue, Springer Verlag, Vienna, 1995.

Multimedia Metaphors - New works by George Legrady, in SCREEN Multimedia, MACup Verlag, 1995. In German.

Art Between High and Low Technology, festival review about WRO 95 (International Sound Basis Visual Art Festival, Wroclaw, Poland) in SCREEN Multimedia, MACup Verlag, May 1995.

New Media Art in Russia: A Conversation with Jackie Apple and Kathy Rae Huffman, edited for 'World Art', 1995.

Time to Interface - Multimedia and Non-linear Media Art, a lecture and text catalogue of lectures on the symposium 'ZEIT', edited by Dr. Heidemarie Seblatnig, for Gesellschaft SYNEMA, Vienna, April 1995.

At Home in the Room of Alenka Pirman, essay for the exhibition brochure 'System VII - Eva Wohlgemuth', Neue Galerie, Graz, 1995.

Realtime: Online, review of live interactive National television performance, ORF II (Austria), for 'EIKON Journal', Vienna, January 1994. In German.

Intelligent Ambiente: Video, in festival catalogue 'Intelligent Ambiente', Ars Electronica, Springer Verlag, 1994.

New Technologies: New Communication Potentials, in 'New Media Logia', Moscow New Media Art Lab exhibition catalogue and symposium publication, edited by Olga Shishko, SCCA, November 1994. In Russian.

That Which Is, essay on the installation work of Bill Viola, for his one-man exhibition catalogue 'Bill Viola', Rio de Janeiro, Brazil, 1994. In Portuguese.

Kunst aus dem Computer, Photo/cover story on the exhibition ITERATIONS at International Center of Photography, New York City, for 'Screen Multimedia', MACup Verlag, Hamburg, 1994. In German.

Interactive TV: The Innovations of Artists, cover photo story for 'Screen Multimedia', MACup Verlag, Hamburg, 1993. In German.

For Tony, in Tony Oursler's fanzine exhibition publication, at Dummies, Dolls and Poison Candy ... Cigarettes, Flowers and Videotape (Bluecoat Gallery and Ikon Gallery, Liverpool, UK, 1993).

Interactive Interferences: Artists interactive television and the challenge of new multimedia television, in ON THE AIR: Kunst im Öffenlichen Datenraum, symposium catalogue edited by Heidi Grundmann (Transit, Innsbruck, 1993).

Video and TV: An historical overview, in 'VIDEO MEDIA: A Survey', anthology edited by Minna Tarka, Taide, Helsinki, 1993. In Finnish.

Media Madness in Tokyo, in 'Montage', a quarterly journal, Medienwerkstadt Wien, Vienna 1993. In German.

A Political Interference: Art on Television, in SCAN festival catalogue, Scan Gallery, Tokyo, 1992. In Japanese.

Installation: Art, Media, Social Statement, 'Montage', a quarterly journal on media art (Medienwerkstadt Wien, Vienna, 1992). In German.

Excess: Power, Pain and Pleasure, catalogue text to accompany video program, MUU Media Festival, Helsinki, Finland, 1992.

Branda Miller: Media Activist, bibliography and text for brochure for video presentation at Kölnischer Kunstverein, Cologne, Germany, 1992.

Video: Violence, in festival catalogue OUT OF CONTROL, edited by Gottfried Hattinger, Ars Electronica festival, Linz 1991.

Richard Kern: An Interview, in festival catalogue OUT OF CONTROL, ibid.

Video Art: What's TV Got To Do With It?, in: Illuminating Video: An Essential Guide to Video Art, anthology edited by Doug Hall and Sally Jo Fifer (Aperture / BAVC, 1991).

Painter, Do You Know Your Duty?, essay for the one person exhibition catalogue 'Ves slikar Svoj dolg', at the Galerija Moderna Ljubljana, Slovenia, 1991.

Women, Myth and Sexuality, in EMAF European Media Art Festival catalogue, Osnabrück 1990.

Producing and presenting Video on Television: The CAT Fund, presentation text for Ars Electronica Festival catalogue, Linz, Austria, 1987.

The Arts for Television, co-editor with Dorine Mignot and Julie Lazar, exhibition catalogue, MOCA, Stedelijk Museum, 1987, and author of the text 'Seeing is Believing'.

Doug Hall: The Spectacle of Image, catalogue 'Videoworks by Doug Hall', The ICA Boston, 1987.

Muntadas: Expposicion, in exhibition catalogue 'Muntadas: Selection de Trabajos en Video 1974-1984', Fernando Viande Gallery, Madrid, 1985. In Spanish.

More than a Decade, in exhibition catalogue 'Video: A Retrospective' edited by Kira Perov, Long Beach Museum of Art, 1984.

Video Art: A Personal Medium, in exhibition catalogue 'The Second Link: Viewpoints on Video in the Eighties', edited by Lorne Falk, The Banff Centre, Canada, 1983.

California Video, editor for exhibition catalogue, Long Beach Museum of Art, 1980.

Southern California Video Resources Directory, editor of an annotated list of artists, institutions, exhibition sites, collections, and publications on video. Published by Some Serious Business, Inc., Los Angeles, 1979. Funded in part by the National Endowment for the Arts Media Program.

=== Member in advisory boards ===
- Astana Art Fest, advisor (2015)
- ACM Siggraph, Digital Arts Community Committee (2015)
- ISEA Board (at large) 2000-2003
- Lyn Blumenthal Memorial Foundation, Art Institute of Chicago, USA (charter member – now inactive)
- C3 (Center for Communication and Culture), Budapest, Hungary (1996 & 1997)
- VideoMedeja, woman's media art festival, Novi Sad, Yugoslavia (1997)
- Van Gogh TV, advisor for content and international relations (1996–1998)
- Association of New Media Technologies, Moscow, Russia (1995 & 1996)
- IDEA, the online directory of media people, institutions, resources, Paris, France (1997).
- RHIZOME ONLINE, New York (1995–1997)
- VISIONS, magazine for film and television, European Advisor (1991–93)
- Video Data Bank European Rep (1991–1995)
- Women in Film and Video, Boston: Festival Advisor (1988).
- Regional Board Member NAMAC: National Alliance of Media Art Centers (1982–83)

=== Donations ===
Huffman has donated a significant selection of her curatorial library of books to Goldsmiths art college library (the Kathy Rae Huffman Media Art Library) in London, including catalogues and rare documentation of media and video art of the 1970s -1990s. It gives insight into the practice of media art, before internet. Most of these publications are not online - they were limited productions, not widely distributed. She has placed her personal, curatorial video collection of approximately 1000 VHS titles for preservation at the North West Film Archive in Manchester, in association with the Manchester School of Art, in 2008.
