= Contemporary Art Television Fund =

The Contemporary Art Television (CAT) Fund was an initiative seed-funded for three years by the Massachusetts Council on the Arts and Humanities, 1983-1986. The fund was a collaboration between the Institute of Contemporary Art, Boston and WGBH-TV.

Kathy Rae Huffman was appointed curator/producer with a mandate to create a context for artists to define television as a medium for personal expression. The Fund was to increase visibility of artists' work in television, to create larger distribution markets for artists' television/video, and to experiment with methods for funding and self-sustaining strategies for media arts production.

== Projects ==
Events, meetings of producers, and presentations were conducted. The following projects were commissioned and co-produced by The CAT Fund, 1984-1991 (in alphabetical order):

- Laurie Anderson: What You Mean We? (video, produced in collaboration with Alive from Off Center, 1986)
- Burt Barr and James Benning: O Panama (video co-produced with New TV Workshop 1985)
- Dara Birnbaum: Will-O'-The-Wisp (video/installation, 1985)
- Peter D'Agostino: String Cycles (interactive work, 1991)
- Ken Feingold: Irony (TV narrative, 1985)
- Doug Hall: Storm and Stress (video, 1986)
- Joan Jonas: Double Lunar Dogs (video, 1984)
- Joan Logue: New England Fisherman: Spots (video portraits, 1985)
- Chip Lord and Mickey McGowen: Easy Living (video, 1984)
- Branda Miller: Time Squared (video for TIME CODE, 1987)
- Jacques Louise and Daniele Nyst: L'Image (video and computer animation, 1987)
- Marcel Odenbach: As If Memories Could Deceive Me (video and installation, 1986)
- Tony Oursler: EVOL (video, 1984)
- Tony Oursler and Constance DeJong: Relatives (video and performance, produced in collaboration with the exhibition BiNational: American Art of the Late 80's, and toured internationally, 1988-1989)
- Daniel Reeves: Ganapati / a spirit in the bush (video, 1986)
- Raul Ruiz: Expulsion of the Moors The (installation with video, co-produced with IVAM (Valencia) and the Galerie Nationale du Jeu de Paume, Paris, 1990)
- Bill Seaman: The Watch Detail (interactive computer installation)
- Bill Seaman: The Water Catalogue (video, 1984)
- Ilene Segalove: More TV Stories (video, 1985)
- Michael Smith & William Wegman: The World of Photography (video, produced in collaboration with "Alive From Off Center", 1986)
- Bill Viola: I Do Not Know What it is I Am Like (video, video laserdisc co-produced with The Voyager Co., 1986)

In 1997, the deCordova Museum presented The CAT Fund as part of its History of Video Art in Boston series. Part II: The 1980s.
