= Iñigo Salaberria =

Spanish video artist

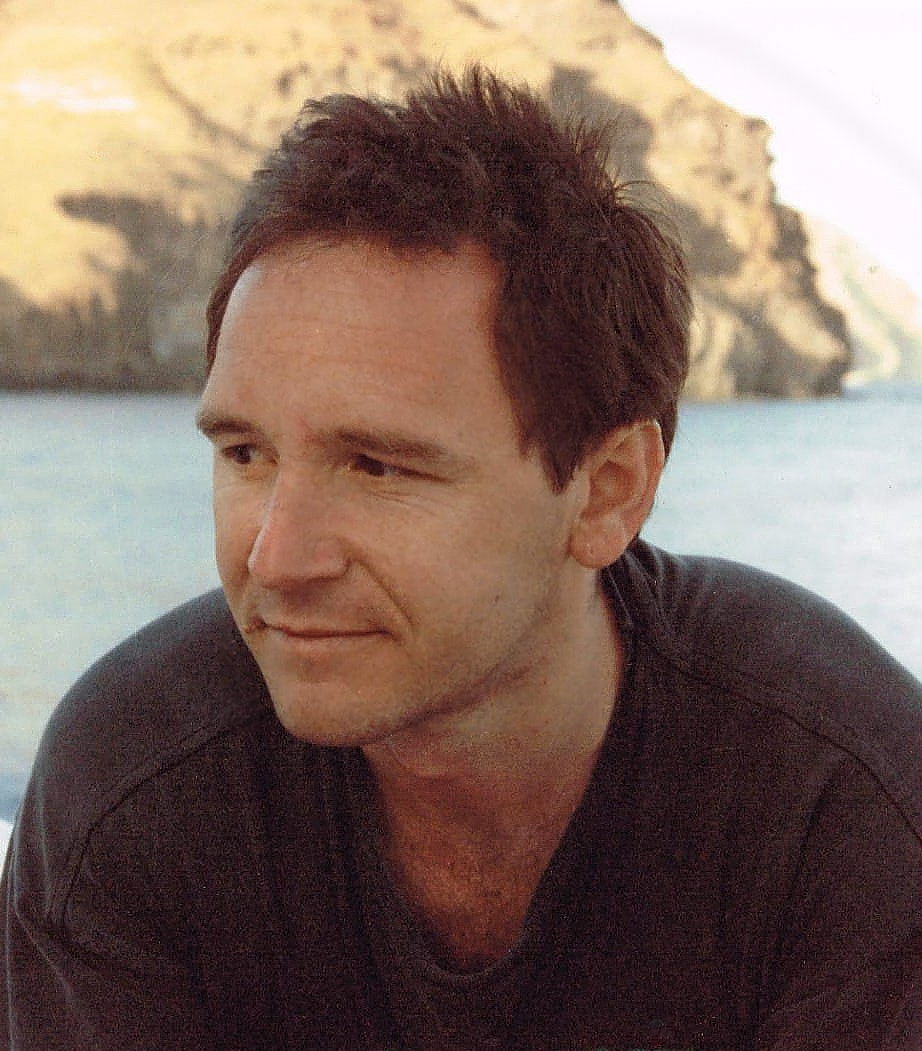
- (1994)
- Born: April 16, 1961; Errenteria, Basque Country, Spain
- Died: September 2, 2022 (aged 61); Donostia / San Sebastian, Basque Country, Spain
- Known for: Video art

Iñigo Salaberria Lizarazu (1961–2022) was a video maker (video art and documentaries) from 1984 until his passing.

== Biography ==
=== Education ===
Born in Errenteria, Basque Country, his first encounters with audiovisuals during adolescence were in the cinema clubs of his local surroundings. In 1978, he attended the Cinematography Course at the Department of History and Aesthetics of Cinematography at the University of Valladolid. The following year, in Lyon, he had his first encounter, as a spectator, with video art, exhibited at the Espace Lyonnais d’Art Contemporain (ELAC). Between 1981 and 1985, he studied Film History and Aesthetics at Sorbonne Nouvelle University - Paris 3, Censier campus. In 1984 and 1985, he participated in visual media arts workshops at the American Center in Paris as a technical assistant to one of the pioneers of video art in France, Michel Jaffrennou, as well as Joan Logue, William Wegman, and Ken Feingold. It was during this time that he made his first video, Quai de Javel, marking the beginning of a career that spanned almost forty years and included around twenty video works. Additionally, during the 1980s, there was a vibrant videographic movement in the Basque Country. Directed by Guadalupe Echevarria, the International Video Festival of San Sebastián (1982–1984) and the Vitoria Music Video Festival (from 1985 onwards) emerged, while organized by the Bostgarren collective, the Tolosa Video Festival (1987–1990) was established. Salaberria participated in all of them.

=== Professional Trajectory ===
Between 1978 and 1996, he resided in Lyon, Paris, Reykjavik, London, and Madrid. From then on, he lived in Donostia-San Sebastián.

This trajectory is reflected in the diversity of places where Salaberria recorded his videos: Paris (Quai de Javel), Iceland (Birta Myrkur, Birta Myrkur II, Luz a la deriva), Mali (La noche navegable, Diario Dogón), India (Benares-Sanganer, En un país de cenizas), Beijing (Las horas contadas, 318, Shunbai Lu), Japan (Lo-Ibiltariak), Croatia (Rijeka), and Mexico City (Antes del después: 10 días en la Biblioteca Vasconcelos).

During the period 1991-1993, with a grant from the Department of Audiovisuals of the Provincial Council of Gipuzkoa, he carried out his projects at the Molinare company (Madrid headquarters), specialized in audiovisual post-production.

Arteleku (1987-2014), a non-academic center for training and production of contemporary art located in Donostia-San Sebastián, was important in Iñigo Salaberria's career. For five years, until 2010, he had a workspace there, but even before that, he was involved in the center's activities. This was recalled by Santiago Eraso, director of Arteleku

His initial works were among the first to be included in the pioneering "Videotheca" (Videolibrary) - his name appears in the third volume of the catalog, alphabetically ordered between Ulrike Rosenbach and John Sanborn; he actively participated in the three occasions when the "Encounters of Video Creation" were held, between 1987 and 1989, alongside Eugeni Bonet, Eugenia Balcells, or Carles Pujol, among others; he directed a video workshop on his work in 1994; he collaborated with the magazine Zehar, where he wrote in 1996 about "Painting in motion"; and he directed the second video we produced that same year to promote the institution; he was also one of the first to be responsible for the pioneering digitization of numerous audiovisual materials from the Documentation Center, at the request of its manager Miren Eraso Iturrioz. He was, in short, one of the artists who understood most and best what the institution offered him and, in response, he was also one of those who, by personally involving himself in several projects and actively committing to other creators and colleagues, knew how to appreciate it best. He did all his projects with plenty of generosity, as Isabel Herguera, another exemplary artist of that institution with whom he collaborated on numerous occasions, reminded me on the day of his passing.

From his small production company, Darwin, Salaberria worked as a technician (camera, editing, etc.) in a wide range of audiovisual productions and, as a director, he was hired by various institutions.

== Work ==
In 1994, contemporary art and new media critic Karin Ohlenschläger, as part of a retrospective dedicated to Salaberria that was organized by the International Video Exhibition of Cádiz, stated:

The essence of all of Iñigo Salaberria's work: a look. It is not a blind look which bounces off the surfaces of what seems apparent. It is a look which is able to see and which penetrates into the opaque tissue of what is apparent, thus allowing us to perceive what comes out of that. His long videographic career is merely the trajectory of a look, the trajectory what "I see". And it is because, where the apparent and the true are not the same, it seems that space and time have to break to be able to perceive the secrets beyond the apparent.

Art critic Peio Aguirre, after viewing his videography as part of an invitation to Salaberria from the Elías Querejeta Film School to present his work, pointed out:

There are two main features of Salaberria's work: on the one hand, his commitment to the "work of images," or to an ontology of the image, that is, an ethics when it comes to producing images and an investigation into the secrets of regimes of vision. On the other hand, an insistence on the technical possibilities of the video as an alternative to the more costly, or industrial, cinema. This latter translates into a formal exploration of each and every one of the abilities and resources that video incorporated as "new media" during the 1980s and 1990s.

And in relation to the gaze, as Ohlenschläger already pointed out, Aguirre states:

The other films that make up his videography cannot be reduced to an argument, to a synopsis, or a single narrative thread. What matters is the questioning of the gaze in the production of images; looking, stopping, observing, the passage of time, slowness. The slow work of images, their deceleration. These are the things that mattered to Iñigo Salaberria.

Gabriel Villota, an expert in Audiovisual Communication and professor at the University of the Basque Country, one of the earliest and best connoisseurs of Salaberria's work, traces the evolution of that gaze:

The viewer can witness the transformation of a gaze that in early pieces, such as Quai de Javel (1984), Caliza (1985), or Disdirak (1992), almost starts from the premises of impressionist painting, to later become a hybrid gaze that oscillates between that of the romantic traveler or the experimental ethnographer, in works such as La noche navegable (1993) or Benares-Sanganer (1999), and finally identify with the figure of the solitary hunter, or the sniper lurking in the night, in works that constitute what he himself called his "Nocturnal Trilogy" formed by Las horas contadas (2010), filmed in China, Luz a la deriva (2015), in Iceland, and Lo-Ibiltariak (2017) in Japan.

Salaberria himself, in an interview with Maria Elorza a few months before his death, partly included in "At the Water's Edge", pointed out his way of making videos:

The challenge for me was to move away from the weight of reality. To abstract. What I was telling you about framing, related to painting. I wanted to escape. Lack of gravity, floating, a little ethereal. That moment when you are no longer bound to the earth. Then the body can take on other forms. I liked that a lot.

Wandering, walking, looking. Without hurry, with time. Sometimes things arise like that, in the most unexpected way. Waiting for something to arise. It doesn't have to be something relevant. Let things fall into place where you want them to. A shift, a light, anything.

Yes, you are right when you say there is a fleeting character, of wandering. Walking, looking, wasting time. I've never been in a hurry recording. That slowness, I don't know why, I liked it. Well, yes I do. Because what I am interested in documenting is what's inside.

His video works have been broadcast by RTVE (Metrópolis, Grandes Documentales), Canal+ (Pieces), EITB, Belgian RTBF, German Südwest 3, WDR Cologne.

Weeks after his death, Metrópolis, RTVE's space for culture and contemporary art, dedicated a monographic retrospective to Iñigo Salaberria with the suggestive title Walking to see (the light), waiting to see (the shadow), scripted by Gabriel Villota.

In its 64th edition (2022), Zinebi-Bilbao International Documentary and Short Film Festival posthumously awarded the Mikeldi of Honour to Iñigo Salaberria

=== Videoart ===
- Quai de Javel (Bleach quay) (1984, 10:21).

Selected work at the II Video Festival of San Sebastián for the representation of the Basque Producers Association at the Berlin International Film Festival (1985).

- Caliza (Limestone) (1985, 10:04).
- Birta Myrkur (1987, 09:31).

First Prize at the Bideoaldia Video Festival in Tolosa (Gipuzkoa) / Honorable Mention at the III Young Video Exhibition in Seville / Special Mention at the VI Music Video Contest in Vitoria-Gasteiz / Work acquired by the Ministry of Culture of France after the jury's designation at the 1st European Biennale of Documentary Cinema/Television. Lyon.

- Sombras de cal (Lime shadows) (1990, 10:18)
- Disdirak (Sparkles) (1992, 09:49).

Award for the best creative use of technological media at the 8th International Video Exhibition of Cádiz 1992 / Official Section VideoFest’93. Berlin / Official Section Deutscher Videokunstpreis 1993 / International Selection. European Media Art Festival 92. Osnabrück / Official Section. DokumentART 1994. Neubrandenburg / 6th Rencontres Vidéo Art Plastique. Hérouville Saint-Clair / Invideo: III Mostra Internazionale di Video d'Arte e Ricerca. Milano, 1995.

- La noche navegable (The navigable night) (1993, 16:34).

First Prize at the 5th International Video Festival Cidade de Vigo / First Prize at the 5th International Video Festival of the Canary Islands / First Prize at the 1st National Video Contest. Lorca (Murcia) / Official Section. Videonale.6. Bonn / Invideo: III Mostra Internazionale di Video d'Arte e Ricerca. Milano, 1995.

- Benares-Sanganer (1999, 04:36).
- Las horas contadas (The counted hours) (2010, 14:58).

First Prize at the IV Video Art Award from the Astillero City Council - El Almacén de las Artes / Official Documentary Section. XIV CanariasMediafest 2010: International Festival of Arts and Digital Cultures of Gran Canarias.

- Birta Myrkur II (2015, 13:02).
- Luz a la deriva (Drifting Light) (2015, 17:51)

1st Special Mention from ABC Critic for Best Cinematography Director at the VII Edition of the Ibero-American Short Film Festival ABC (FIBABC) / Selection for the Kimuak catalog of Basque short films. 2015 / Master of Observations Section. Miedzynarodwy Festival Filmowy Zlote Mrówkojady 2016 / Experimental Narratives Section. Intermediaciones: III Exhibition of Video Art & Experimental Video. Medellín / Official Section. 57th Zinebi-International Documentary and Short Film Festival of Bilbao / International Documentary Section. 21st Portobello Film Festival. London / International Video Art Section. 33rd Tehran International Short Film Festival / Experimental Competition. 14th Athens International Digital Film Festival

- Lo-Ibiltariak (Sleep walkers) (2017, 15:13)

Official Documentary Short Film Section. 21st Málaga Film Festival / Official Section. 59th Zinebi-International Documentary and Short Film Festival of Bilbao

- Rijeka (2019, 10:00)

Official Section. VIII Size Doesn't Matter Festival. Barcelona / Bertoko Begiradak Section - Short Films Lab. 61st ZINEBI-International Documentary and Short Film Festival of Bilbao

- Al borde del agua / On the Water's Edge (2023, 19:49). With Maria Elorza.

Special Mention at the 14th MakeDox Film Festival / Official Section. Punto de Vista: International Documentary Film Festival of Navarra 2023 / Official Section. L’Alternativa: 30th Barcelona Independent Film Festival / Maria Elorza Focus. Porto/Post/Doc: Film & Media Festival 2023 / Spanish Short Film Night Section. 61st Gijón International Film Festival / Panorama Section. CineHorizontes: 22nd Spanish Cinema Festival of Marseille / Open Experimentations Section. Image Ouverte Festival. Paris / 19th London Spanish Film Festival

=== Documentaries ===
- Diario dogón (Dogon diary) (1994, 16:06)

First prize for video documentary at the II Video Contest of Navarra / Official Section of the 9th Fringe Film & Video Festival. Edinburgh / International Competitive Showcase of the 2nd International Video and Electronic Arts Festival of Buenos Aires (FIV 96).

- Arteleku (1996, 23:06)
- En un país de cenizas (In a land of ashes) (2004, 53:10)
- Pulso a la materia: José Ramón Anda (Pulsing matter: José Ramón Anda) (2008, 26:02)

Punto de Vista: International Documentary Film Festival of Navarra 2009

- 318, Shunbai Lu (2010, 37:35)
- Metro Bilbao (2012, 03:38)

2nd prize at the VI Video Art Award from the Astillero City Council - El Almacén de las Artes

- Kaia (The pier) (2016, 22:20)
- Eta gorrek entzuten dute (And the deaf hear) (2016, 13:31)
- Carretera hacia el silencio (Road to silence) (2018, 20:00)
- Antton Elizegi: negro sobre blanco (Antton Elizegi: Black on White) (2020, 17:52)
- Antes del después: 10 días en la Biblioteca Vasconcelos (Before the after: 10 days at the Vasconcelos Library) (2022, 34:26)

1st Meeting of the Ibero-American System of National Networks of Public and School Libraries. National Library of Peru. Lima. November 2022 / Tabakalera-International Center for Contemporary Culture. Donostia-San Sebastián. March 2023 / Fine Arts Library. Complutense University of Madrid. March 2023 / National Congress Library. Buenos Aires. June 2023

== Exhibitions ==
- Videospain: New Video from Spain, 1984-1987. Curated by Eugeni Bonet. Exit Art. New York. April 1988.
- Video Art. The New Generation. Curated by Stefan Sauer. Zentrum für Kunst und Medientechnologie. Karlsruhe. November 1989.
- Best of Europe from the Berlin Video Festival. 35th London Film Festival. November 1991.
- Videoweek, Videocombate: Current Week of Video-Creation. Coordinated by Gabriel Villota. Arteleku. Donostia-San Sebastián. May 1992.
- Bienal de la Imagen en Movimiento’92: Visionarios españoles (Biennal of the Image in Motion '92: Spanish Visionaries). Curated by Carlota Álvarez Basso and Joseba M. Lopezortega. Museo Nacional Centro de Arte Reina Sofía. December 1992-January 1993.
- Videos und Computeranimation aus Spanien (Videos and computer animation from Spain). Presented by Maria Pallier. VideoFest’94. Berlin. February 1994.
- Señales de vídeo: aspectos de la videocreación española de los últimos años (Video Signals: Aspects of Spanish Video Creation in Recent Years). Curated by Eugeni Bonet. Museo Nacional Centro de Arte Reina Sofía. 1995-1996.
- Spain cannot but look at Africa: A Contemporary Spanish Video Art Exhibition. Curated by DCD Association & Mzansicultura & Hamaca. University of Pretoria. February-March 2011.
- Vidéothèque éphémère. Videoformes 2011 Festival. Clermont-Ferrand. March-April.
- VideoStories. Curated by Blanca de la Torre and Imma Prieto. Artium Museum. Vitoria-Gasteiz. 2011.
- Let’s go to China: Spanish Contemporary Art Exhibition. Curated by Judas Arrieta. EGG Gallery (Beijing) and Instituto Cervantes de Beijing. 2012.
- Bertan Bilbao / Proyecto Bilbao (Bertan Bilbao / Project Bilbao). Curated by Anatxu Zabalbeakoa. Azkuna Zentroa - Alhóndiga de Bilbao. November 2012.
- Video Art Collection, Astillero City Council. Curated by Salvador Carretero, Laura Cobo, and Isabel Portilla. Museum of Modern and Contemporary Art of Santander and Cantabria. February 2016.
- BideOtik: atendiendo a otras narrativas audiovisuales (BideOtik: Attending to other audiovisual narratives). Curated by Itxaso Díaz. Azkuna Zentroa - Alhóndiga de Bilbao. 2016.
- El arte del tiempo (The Art of Time). Curated by Guadalupe Echevarría. Museo de Bellas Artes de Bilbao. November 2018.
- Focus: Cine vasco contemporáneo (Focus: Contemporary Basque Cinema). Heterogeneous Landscapes. Curated by Zinebi. 69th International Short Film Festival Oberhausen. 2023.

== Retrospectives ==
- Retrospectiva Iñigo Salaberria (Iñigo Salaberria Retrospective). 1st Video Exhibition "Navarra Festivals". Pamplona. (August 1992).
- Retrospectiva Iñigo Salaberria (Iñigo Salaberria Retrospective). 9th International Video Exhibition of Cádiz (November 1994)
- Iñigo Salaberria: projecció retrospectiva 1987-2001 (Iñigo Salaberria: retrospective projection 1987-2001). Videocreació. Oscil.lant Collective Association. Gandía (Valencia). (2001)
- Videologías: vídeos de Iñigo Salaberria (Videologies: Videos by Iñigo Salaberria). Montehermoso Cultural Center of Vitoria-Gasteiz (October 2006)
- Iñigo Salaberria Filmography: BideOtik. Curated by Itxaso Díaz. Azkuna Zentroa - Alhóndiga de Bilbao. (November 2016).
- Arqueología de la mirada, exhibición videográfica de Iñigo Salaberria (Archaeology of the Gaze, Video Exhibition by Iñigo Salaberria). Vasconcelos Library. Mexico City. (July 2018)
- Iñigo Salaberria: poética de la imagen (Iñigo Salaberria: Poetics of the Image). Poetry Classroom of the Faculty of Philology at the University of Seville. (May 2019) ()
- Homenaje a Iñigo Salaberria (Tribute to Iñigo Salaberria). Curated by Gabriel Villota. Museo de Bellas Artes de Bilbao. (October 2022)
- Iñigo Salaberria, in memoriam. DokuIrun. Irun. (May 2023)
