= Patrick Hünerfeld =

Patrick Bernhard Hünerfeld – born 1969 in Freiburg in Breisgau – is a German physician and journalist whose documentary films have won several scientific awards.

== Life ==
Instead of medical school graduation in the department psychiatry and psychotherapy at the Albert-Ludwigs-University on his birth town as a doctor to work, he sat at the Johannes Gutenberg University Mainz a postgraduate course of Journalism and was in Baden-Baden reporter of the SWR broadcast Rhineland-Palatinate currently magazine, in 2001 he moved to the SWR's science department in Baden-Baden. Print, radio and television contributions, among others in daily News, Tagesthemen, ARD Mittagsmagazin and Nightmagazine, W as knowledge the ARD, various posts on art and nano on 3sat such as Odysso and concerns in the SWR television.

== Publications ==
- Prädiktoren der kombinierten Schlafentzug-/Schlafphasen-Vorverlagerungstherapie bei Major Depression, Dissertation, Freiburg 2002

== Filmography and awards ==
As author and director:

- 2008: "Concerns": "Doping und die Freiburger Sportmedizin" (Doping and the Freiburg Sports Medicine) in the SWR television, awarded the Peter-Hans-Hofschneider-Recherchepreis for science and medical journalism
- 2009: "Concerns": "Schrittmacher fürs Gehirn" (Pacemaker for the brain), on SWR television, awarded the DGPPN Media Prize for Science Journalism German Society for Psychiatry, Psychotherapy and Neurology (DGPPN)
- 2011: "Concerns": "Nie wieder Rückenschmerzen" (Never again back pain), on SWR television, together with Inge Bachl
- 2012: "Der Zecken-Krieg – Wie gefährlich ist die Borreliose?“ (The Ticks War – How dangerous is the Lyme Disease?), in the SWR television, awarded the German Journalists' Prize Neurology of the German Society of Neurology (DGN) and "Zecken-Borreliose – Unterschätzte Gefahr oder eingebildete Krankheit?" (Tick Disease – Underestimated Danger or Imaginary Disease?), on art TV
