= Daniel Reeves =

Daniel Reeves may refer to:

- Daniel Reeves (artist) (born 1948), American artist and filmmaker
- Dan Reeves (1944–2022), American football player and coach
- Dan Reeves (American football executive) (1912–1971), American football owner, member of the Pro Football Hall of Fame
- Danny C. Reeves (born 1957), United States federal judge
