= Nina Kunzendorf =

German actress (born 1971)

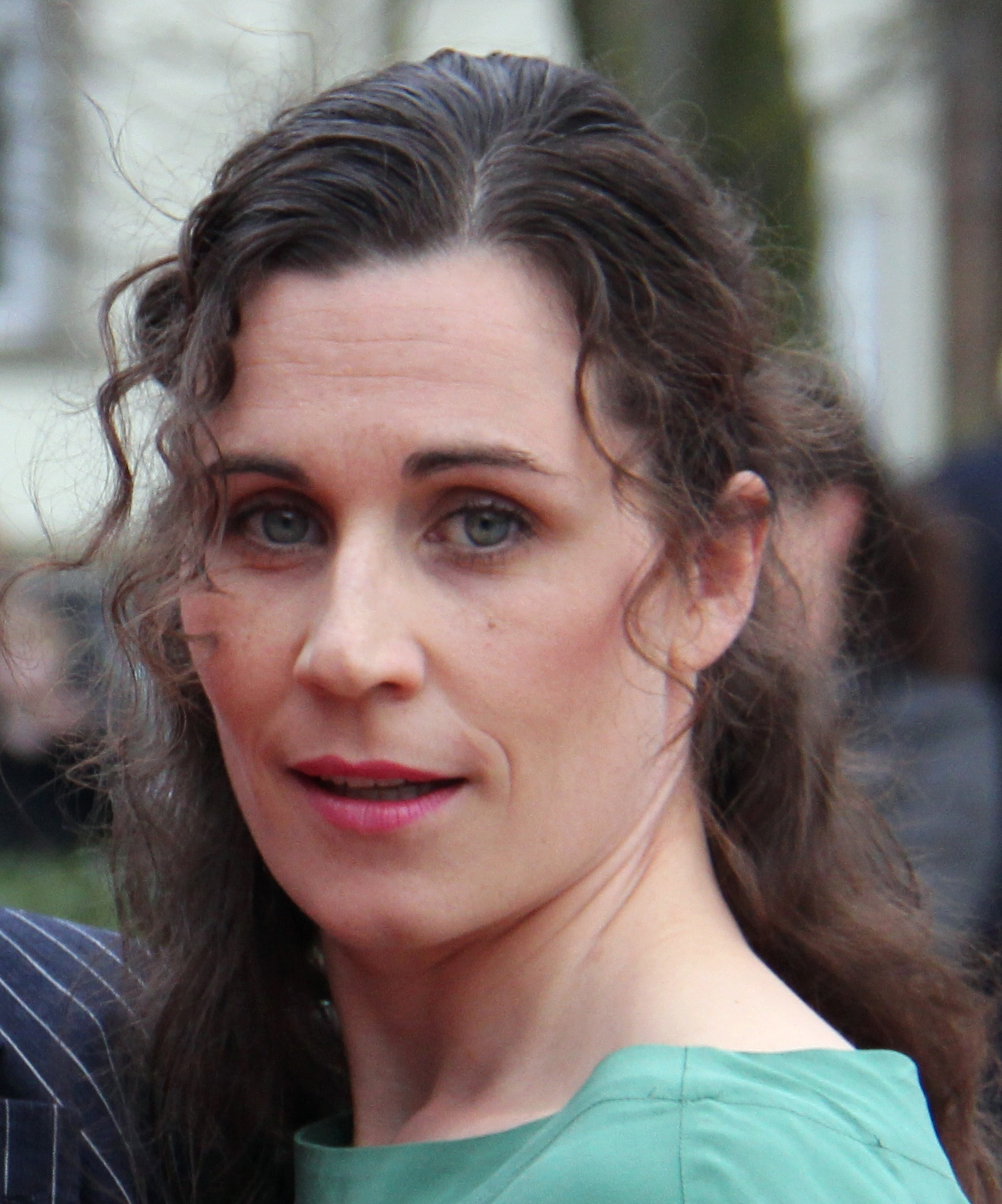
Nina Kunzendorf (2011)

Nina Kunzendorf (born November 10, 1971) is a German actress. Her credits include the television series Tatort and The Black Forest Murders (2025) and the films Phoenix, Woman in Gold and Unspoken.

== Early life ==
Kunzendorf was born in Mannheim, Baden-Württemberg and is Member of the German Filmakademie. She has two children.
