= Alfons (comedian) =

French cabaret artist

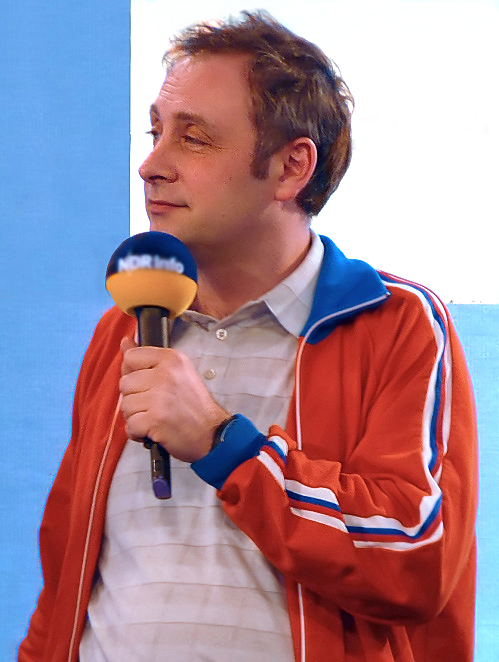
- Alfons in 2009
- Born: Emmanuel Peterfalvi; 17 March 1967 (age 59); Paris, France
- Occupations: Comedian, actor, television presenter
- Website: www.alfons-fragt.de

Emmanuel Peterfalvi, also known by his stage name Alfons (born March 17, 1967, in Paris), is a French comedian, actor and television presenter living in Germany.

Peterfalvi came to Germany for his military service in the French Army. He learned the German language and decided to stay in Hamburg, after he "fell in love with Germany and the Germans". In 1994, he began his career in the television show Kalkofes Mattscheibe on German pay TV network Premiere.

On 3 November 2017, Peterfalvi became a German citizen while maintaining his native French citizenship.

== Television ==
- 2006–present : Alfons und Gäste (Das Erste and SWR Fernsehen)
- 2007 : Deutschland lacht ...
- 2009–present : Puschel TV (ARD)
- 2014 : Ein Fall fürs All (ZDF) with Urban Priol

== Radio ==
- 2008–present : Gesellschaftsabend (Saarländischer Rundfunk)
- 2015–present : Bonjour Alfons (SWR1 Baden-Württemberg)

== Awards ==
- 2021 Order of Merit of the Federal Republic of Germany
