= Faces (online community) =

Digital media community for women

Faces is an international online community of women who share an interest in digital media arts. They communicate via an email list and organize events both online and off. Founded in 1997, this informal network includes activists, artists, critics, theoreticians, technicians, journalists, researchers, programmers, networkers, web designers, and educators.

== History ==
Faces was founded in 1997 by three participants in the first wave of net art — Kathy Rae Huffman, Diana McCarty, and Valie Djordjevic — as a response to the relative invisibility of women working in the field of new media arts. Initially, Huffman and McCarty served as co-moderators and Djordjevic as technical advisor. Ushi Reiter joined the team in 2000. Through email and meet-ups at European media arts and culture events, the Faces community discussed what was going on in new media, shared information about projects, and strategized about how to counter the lack of representation of women in the field of new media.

The Faces community has continued to grow and remains instrumental in generating cyberfeminist theory and critique, creating both offline and online spaces for discussion around this topic. It is recognised as part of the first wave of networked arts communities along with such email lists as Nettime, Rhizome, Fibreculture, and _empyre_.

As of 2018, the Faces email list constituted an international community of more than 400 members, with exhibitions and meetings organised within the framework of established art and media festivals and events (such as Ars Electronica, Transmediale, and ISEA) as well as through independent events such as the 20th anniversary of Faces (2017).

Since 2002 the Faces mailing list and website has been hosted by servus.at in Linz, Austria. In 2003, a grant from the Austrian Ministry of Culture enabled the creation of a Faces website, which launched in 2004.

== Key events ==
- "Beauty and the East", Ljubljana, Slovenia, 1997. An informal faces gathering was held during this Nettime Spring Meeting, hosted by Ljudmila.
- First Cyberfeminist International, 20–28 September 1997, Kassel, Germany. Faces members including Kathy Rae Huffman, Diana McCarty, Eva Wohlgemuth, and Josephine Bosma were actively involved in the Hybrid Workshop at this event.
- European Media Arts Festival, 1998, Osnabrück, Germany. Faces members held an open workshop that included web tours, discussions, and information about female online environments. The Austrian artist Margarete Jahrmann presented her performance The fe.mail.data-set: eine server-theorie als SUperFEMper4MANce.
- "Face 2 Face: The Body, Identity and Community in Cyberspace," Forum Stadtpark Graz, Austria, 6–11 July 1998. This was a meeting of women from the Faces mailing list. Organized by Eva Ursprung, the event was conceived to give Faces an opportunity to meet and reflect on the theoretical concepts and artistic responses surrounding the event's theme. It included performance events, an exhibition, and a symposium.
- "Faces in Paris," France, 8 December 2000. This was a cyberfeminist event held at the École nationale supérieure des beaux-arts. It was organized by Kathy Rae Huffman, who was at that time director of Hull Time Based Arts (U.K.), and Nathalie Magnan, media artist of the National School of Fine Arts, Dijon, in collaboration with Arghyro Paouri and in partnership with the C.I.D. - Mediathèque of the École nationale supérieure des beaux-arts in Paris (ENSBA). About thirty women from Europe, Russia, the U.S., and Brazil shared their projects, exhibitions, and critical texts.
- "Faces: 10 years (past and future)," Vienna, Austria, 2007. The 10th anniversary of Faces was held at the VBKÖ Austrian Association of Women Artists, as part of the exhibition "cyber feminism past forward".
- "From C to X: networked feminisms," Ars Electronica, Linz, Austria, 2017. To mark 20 years of Faces in 2017, Faces organized several events at the Ars Electronica festival, including a panel discussion with Alla Mitrofanova (RU), Virginia Barratt (AU) and Annie Goh (UK)on September 6 and the Faces Generated Cupcake Celebration. The events were organized by Valie Djordjevic, Diana McCarty and Ushi Reiter with Kathy Rae Huffman.
- "Celebrating 20 Years of Faces," Graz, Austria, 13–15 October 2017. Other events marking Faces' 20th anniversary took place at the Schaumbad Freies Atelierhaus. The work of more than 50 female artists was seen through an exhibition, performances, a film screening, and other presentations.
