= The Black Forest Murders =

German television crime drama miniseries

- Also known as: Spuren
- Genre: Crime drama, murder mystery
- Created by: Robert Hummel, Martina Mouchot
- Based on: SOKO Erle: Der Mordfall Carolin G. by Walter Roth
- Written by: Robert Hummel, Martina Mouchot
- Directed by: Stefan Krohmer
- Starring: Nina Kunzendorf; Tilman Strauß; Aliki Hirsch; Božidar Kocevski; Atrin Haghdoust
- Music by: Stefan Will
- Country of origin: Germany
- Original language: German
- No. of seasons: 1
- No. of episodes: 4

Production
- Producers: Nils Dünker, Leon Schömig
- Running time: 44–48 minutes
- Production company: Südwestrundfunk (SWR)

Original release
- Network: SWR Fernsehen
- Release: 6 February – 27 February 2025

The Black Forest Murders or Spuren (English: Traces) is a German television murder mystery, crime drama miniseries, which is set in the titular region of Baden-Württemberg. It was co-created by Robert Hummel and Martina Mouchot based on the non-fiction book, SOKO Erle (2016) by Walter Roth. Roth, a police media liaison officer, details a real-life murder investigation, which has been fictionalised for the miniseries. All four episodes are directed by Stefan Krohmer and were broadcast via Südwestrundfunk's Fernsehen network from 6 February 2025. The miniseries stars Nina Kunzendorf as police chief inspector, Barbara and Tilman Strauß as police investigator, Thomas, who work in the fictitious village of Buchingen, in Baden-Württemberg.

== Premise ==
A woman, Stefanie, goes missing while on a Sunday afternoon jog near her village of Buchingen bordering Germany's Black Forest. Her husband, Tobias and fellow villagers begin to search her usual routes. From the following day, police Chief Inspector Barbara heads an investigation squad and is assisted by local inspector Thomas. Stefanie's corpse is discovered in the forest, she had been sexually assaulted and then clubbed to death with an unidentified metal object. Police sift through various strands of evidence. A similar murder occurs in a neighbouring town, but when they discover a suspect: he has an alibi for Stefanie's murder. Barbara's team broaden their investigation and they find parallels between Stefanie's murder and one occurring in Austria four years earlier. DNA analysis verifies that the same perpetrator is involved. In the Austrian case, the murder weapon, a metal pole from a truck jack, was recovered. Squad members Bernd and Navid sort through considerable data collected from toll stations to try to identify the type of truck.

== Cast and characters ==
- Nina Kunzendorf as Barbara Kramer: Police Chief Inspector, Berlin-based former Buchingen resident, Konrad's daughter, returns home after her mother's death
- Tilman Strauß as Thomas Riedle: Buchingen Police Inspector
- Aliki Hirsch as Sandra Hermann: Buchingen police squad member
- Božidar Kocevski as Bernd Klingspor: squad member
- Atrin Haghdoust as Navid Sabet: squad member, IT/communications
- David Richter as Tobias Berghoff: Stefanie's husband, amateur footballer
- Liliane Amuat as Ronja Irlinger: public prosecutor, liaises with Barbara
- Florian Hertweck as Michael Bausching: local handyman, repairs Konrad's home
- Sophia Schober as Sonja Aippersbach: uniform police
- Mira Huber as Britta Schänzl: squad member
- Veronika Bachfischer as Tanja Vucovic: forensic investigator, DNA testing
- Katja Bürkle as Dr. Christine Birkle: forensic pathologist, conducts autopsies
- Elmar Gutmann as Konrad Kramer: Barbara's father, retired teacher, recently widowed
- Carl Achleitner as Marcel Hanschitz: Austrian police detective, liaises with Barbara's squad

== Reception ==
German television critic, Rainer Tittelbach of tittelback.tv praised, "The ensemble, consistently top cast, with [Kunzendorf] as a lighthouse and dialect as the icing on the cake. A direction that always hits the right note. Realistic, undramatic, gripping for 180 minutes!" The Sydney Morning Herald's TV and radio reviewer, Craig Mathieson rated it as four-out-of-five stars and observed, "[its] momentum is constant... even as circumstances escalate, but the focus is [the police's] meticulous, unrelenting investigation. There are no grand deductive leaps, no cat-and-mouse interviews with a prime suspect." Isabella Silvers of redonline.co.uk noticed it's "a gripping fictional police drama, focusing on the credible portrayal of the investigative work." Rebecca Nicholson of The Guardian gave it three-out-of-five stars, "Its attention to every single moving part means that the drama itself moves very slowly, and it is not so much a thriller as a satisfying puzzle, steadily coming together. Not a bad drama, then, but not a revolutionary one, either."
