= John Margolies =

American roadside photographer (1940–2016)

- Born: May 16, 1940; New Canaan, Connecticut, U.S.
- Died: May 26, 2016 (aged 76); New York City, U.S.
- Occupations: Photographer, architecture critic
- Years active: 1970–2016
- Partner: Jane Tai

John Samuel Margolies (May 16, 1940 – May 26, 2016) was an American architectural critic, photographer, and author who was noted for celebrating vernacular and novelty architecture in the United States, particularly those designed as roadside attractions. Starting from the mid-1970s, he began to photograph sites during long road trips, since he was concerned these sites would be displaced by the growing modernist trend. He was credited with shaping postmodern architecture and recognizing buildings that would be added to the National Register of Historic Places through his documentary work. Starting in 2007, the Library of Congress began to acquire his photographs, and created the public domain John Margolies Roadside America Photograph Archive in 2016, consisting of 11,710 scans of his color slides.

== Early life ==
John Samuel Margolies was born on May 16, 1940, in New Canaan, Connecticut, the son of Asher and Ethel (née Polacheck). His father was a grandson of Moses Z. Margolies, a well-known rabbi.

During childhood road trips, he would beg his parents to stop at roadside attractions, but they refused, believing it to be "the ugliest stuff in the world." Margolies studied at the University of Pennsylvania, earning a bachelor's degree in art history and journalism, and a master's degree in communications.

== Career ==
In Andy Warhol's 1965 film Camp, Margolies makes a cameo appearance as Mar-Mar. In the early part of his career, Margolies promoted Warhol's work, which included an essay in Art in America to support Underground Sundae (1968).

After graduating, Margolies took a job at Architectural Record and worked as the program director of the Architectural League of New York, where he organized the Environment postmodern exhibition series. His final exhibit for the Architectural League was a solo show featuring the work of Morris Lapidus, which opened in October 1970 under the title "Architecture of Joy". Lapidus was famed for designing the Eden Roc hotel in Miami Beach, Florida, and the exhibition horrified Margolies's peers. Margolies had Muzak playing in the background during the show to match the atmosphere within the hotel lobbies designed by Lapidus. By that time, Margolies had left New York for Santa Monica, where he, Billy Adler, and Ilene Segalove set up the collective Telethon to document what they called "the television environment"; Margolies took a parting shot at New York in 1971, describing it as "that black hole of Calcutta" in a review of Reyner Banham's Los Angeles: The Architecture of Four Ecologies for Architectural Forum.

Margolies began to photograph novelty architecture in 1972, concerned that these sights were starting to disappear. In 1973, he published an article lauding the Madonna Inn, built by a couple with no formal design experience, in Progressive Architecture. Margolies was funded through grants and fellowships through the National Endowment for the Arts, the John Simon Guggenheim Memorial Foundation, the Alicia Patterson Foundation, and architect Philip Johnson.

Margolies exhibited his photographs at the Hudson River Museum in 1981, a show described by critic Paul Goldberger as "pure joy" and "an articulate plea against the homogenization of the American landscape." That year, Margolies also published his first book of photographs, entitled The End of the Road, referring to the vanishing roadside architecture of the United States. The Library of Congress credits Margolies with shaping the postmodernist movement, and digitized his work in 2016, making it available as public domain.

The photographs distinctively omit people and are taken in full sunlight with clear skies, a deliberate choice to reduce visual distraction. Margolies used slow slide film (likely Kodachrome) with a 50mm "normal" lens.

== Personal life ==
Margolies had one brother, Paul. He was in a long term relationship with Jane Tai, a museum worker, through the end of his life. They lived in Manhattan.

He died of pneumonia on May 26, 2016.

== Other interests ==
Margolies was also a noted collector of postcards, maps, and other travel ephemera.

== Gallery ==
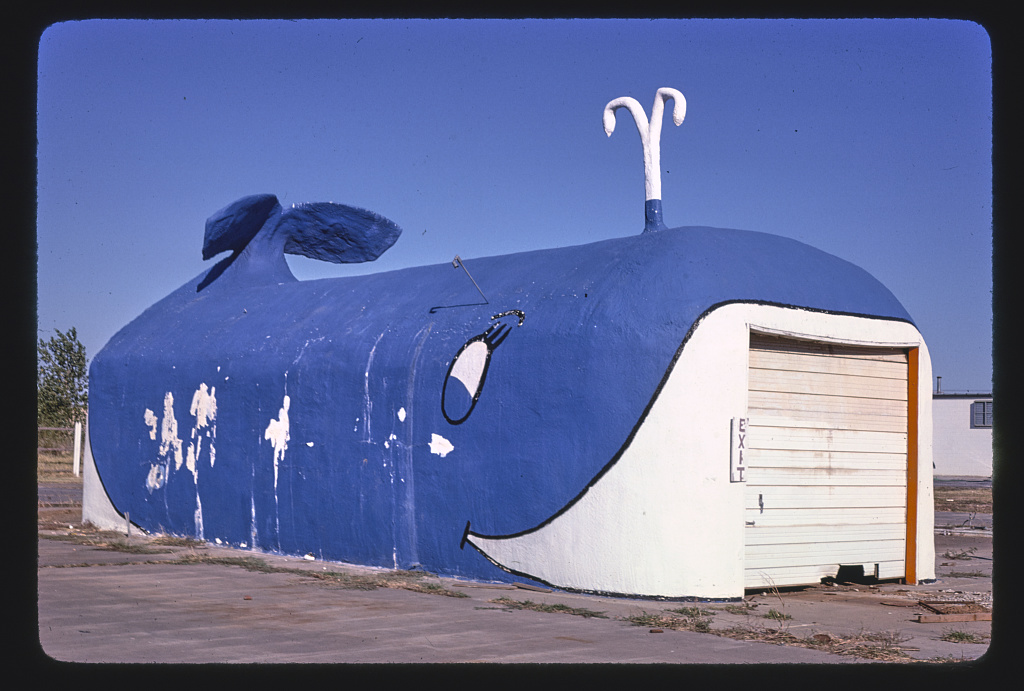
The Whale Car Wash, Oklahoma City (1979)

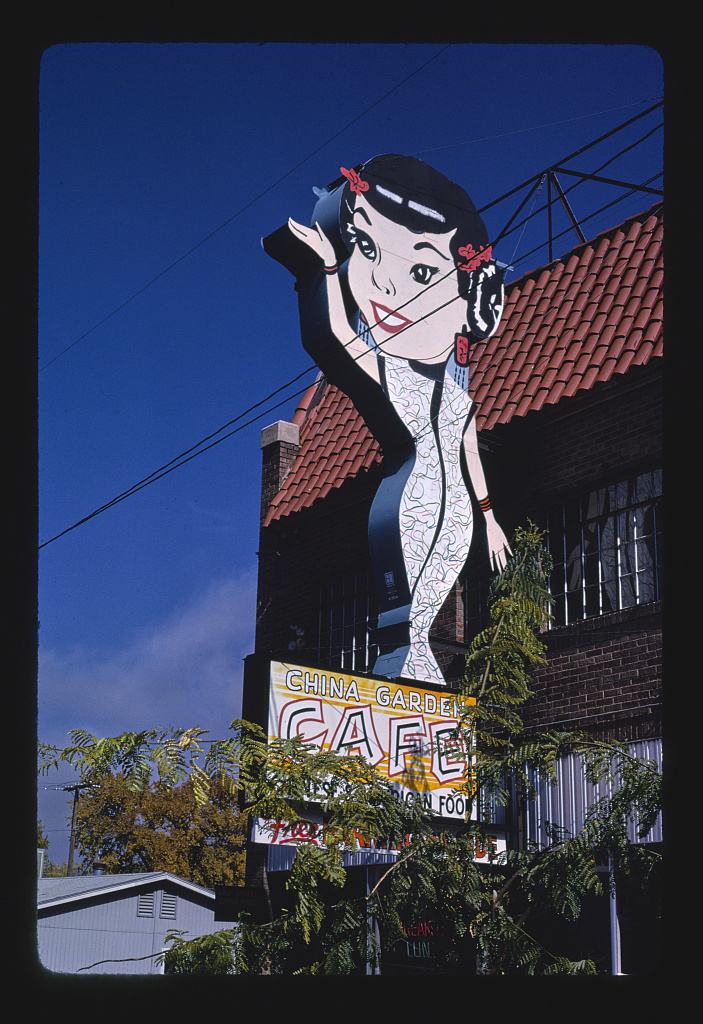
China Garden Cafe sign, Cedar City, Utah (1987)

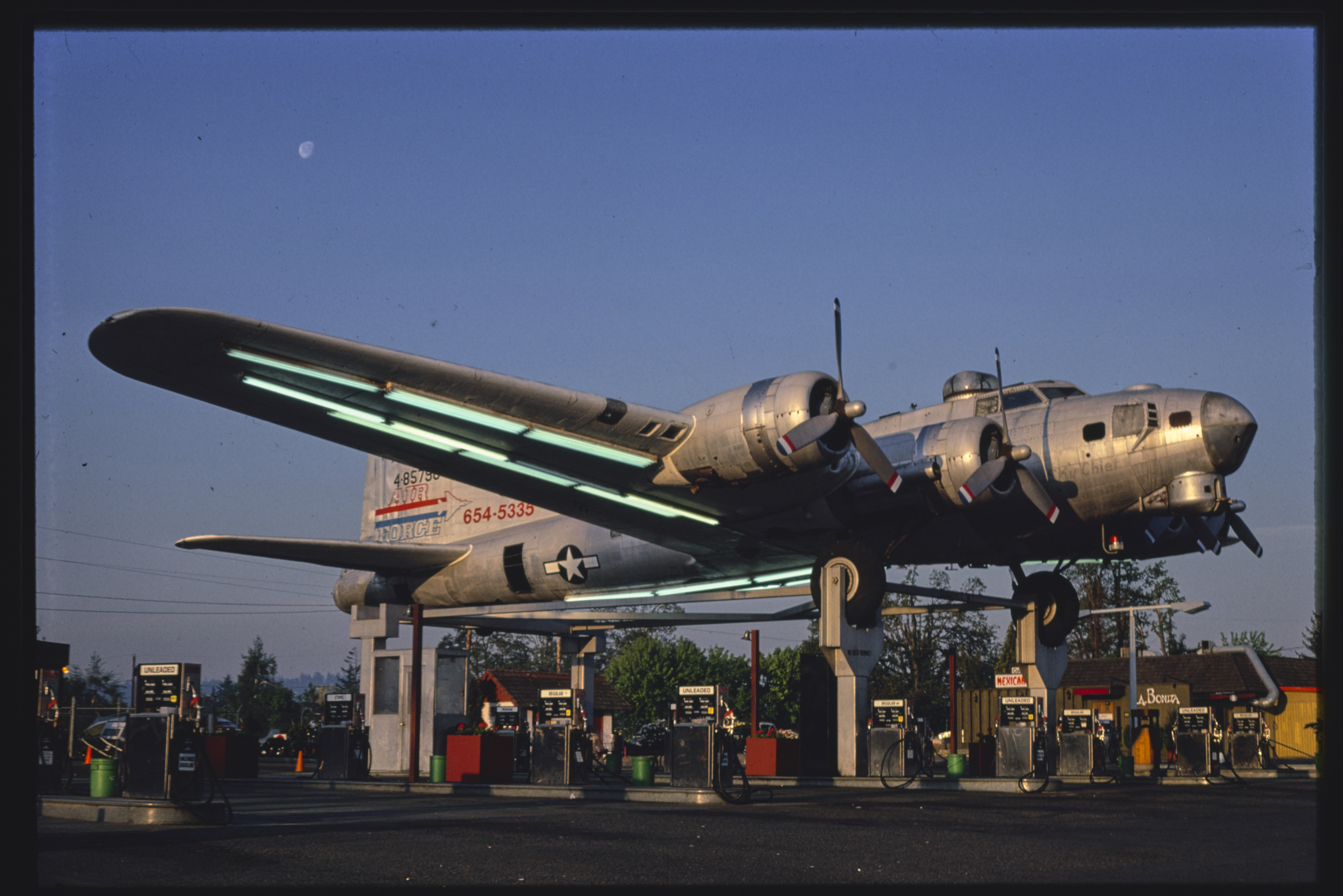
Bomber Gas Station, Milwaukie, Oregon (1980)

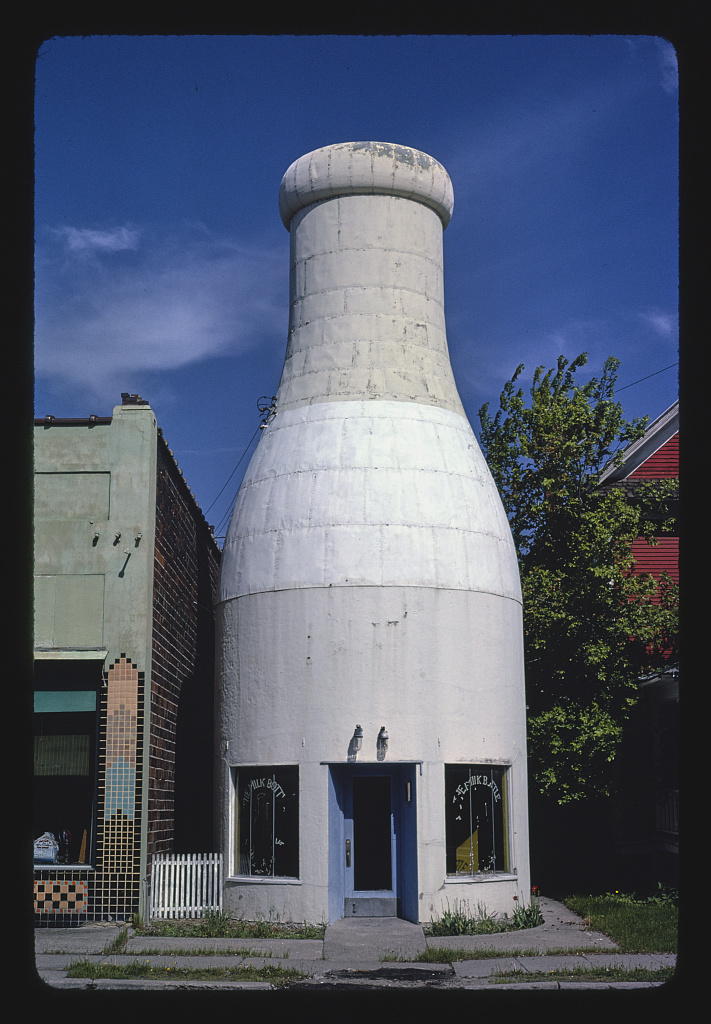
Benewah Dairy Milk Bottle #1, Cedar Street, Spokane, Washington (1980)

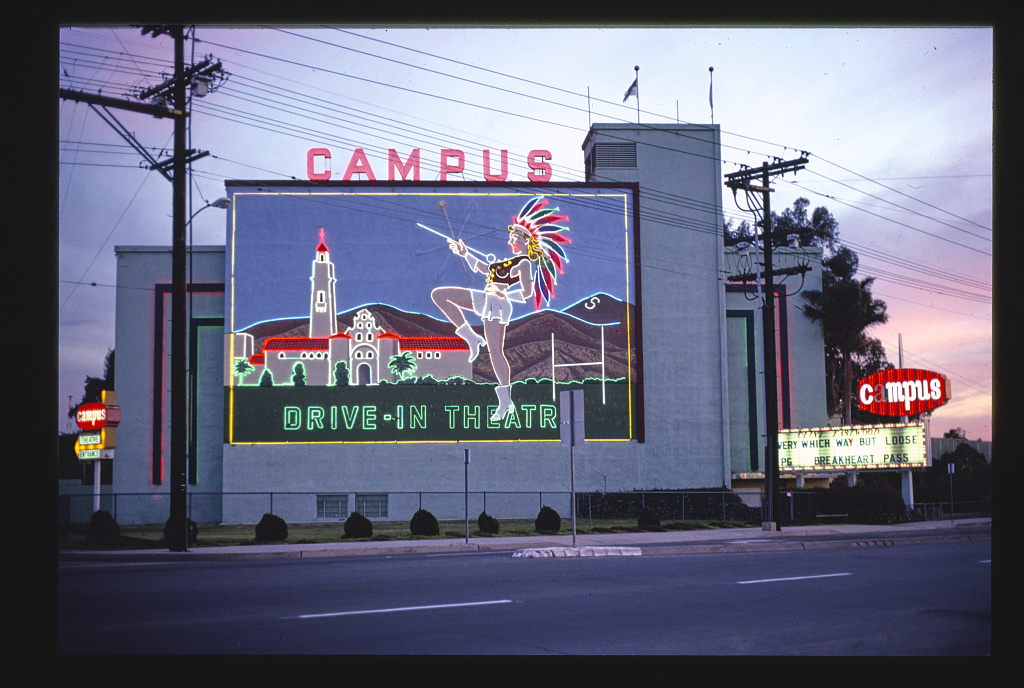
Campus Drive-In Theater, El Cajon Boulevard, San Diego, California (1979)

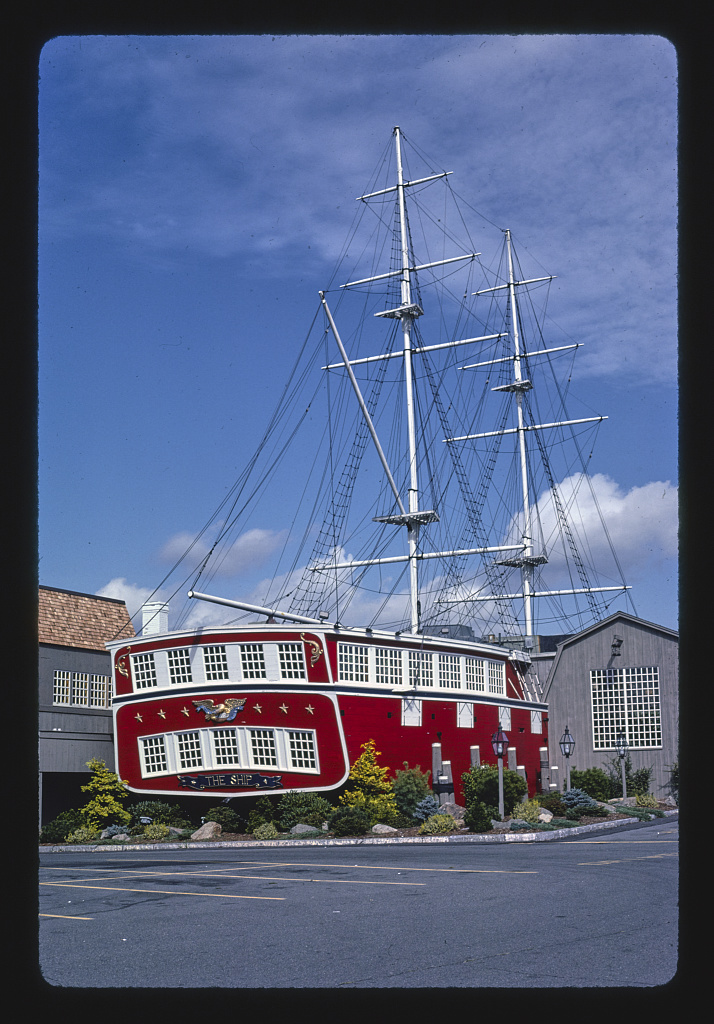
The Ship Restaurant, Route 1, Saugus, Massachusetts (1984)

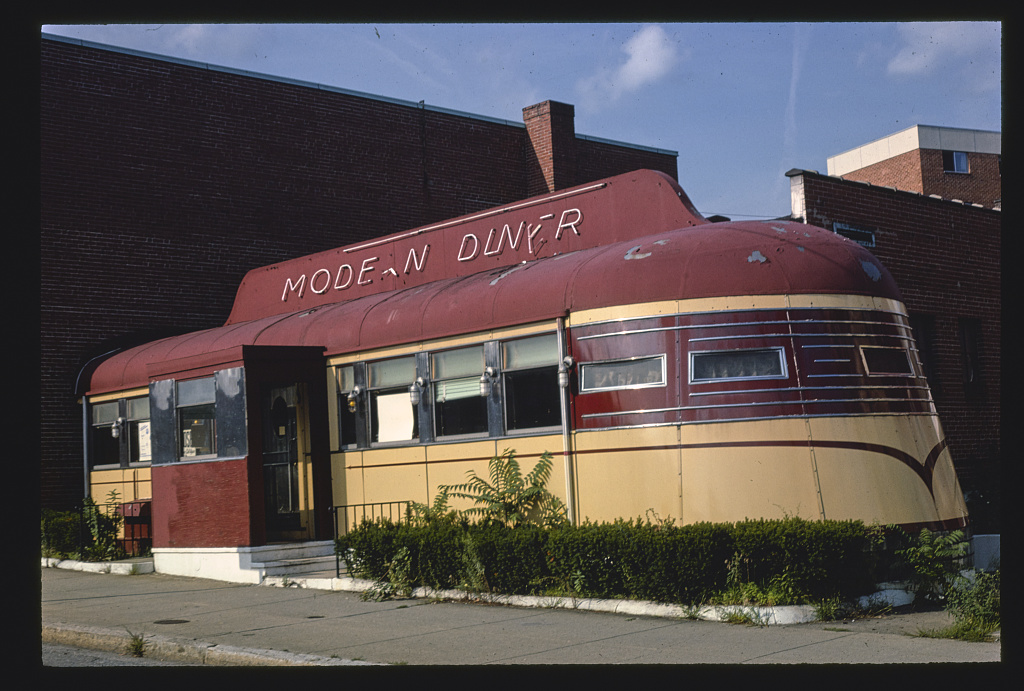
Modern Diner, diagonal front detail, Dexter Avenue, Pawtucket, Rhode Island (1978)

== Bibliography ==
- Margolies, John S. (September 1970). "'Now, once and for all, know why I did it': Morris Lapidus" (PDF). Progressive Architecture. LI (9): 118–22.
- as Telethon; Adler, Billy; Margolies, John (November 1973). "Roadside Mecca" (PDF). Progressive Architecture. LIV (11): 123–28.
- Margolies, John (1981). The End of the Road: Vanishing Highway Architecture in America. New York: Penguin Books. ISBN 9780140058406.
- Garfinckel, Nina; Reidelbach, Maria; Margolies, John (photography) (1987). Miniature Golf. Abbeville Press. ISBN 9780896596849.
- Margolies, John (1993). Pump and Circumstance: Glory Days of the Gas Station. Bulfinch Press. ISBN 978-0-8212-2284-3.
- Margolies, John (1995). Home Away from Home: Motels in America. Bulfinch Press. ISBN 978-0-8212-2162-4.
- Yorke Jr., Douglas A.; Margolies, John; Baker, Eric (April 1996). Hitting the Road: The Art of the American Road Map. Chronicle Books. ISBN 978-0811810159.
- Margolies, John (1998). Fun Along the Road: American Tourist Attractions. Bulfinch Press. ISBN 978-0-8212-2351-2.
- Orcutt, Georgia; Margolies, John (April 2007). Blue Ribbon USA: Prizewinning Recipes from State and County Fairs. San Francisco: Chronicle Books. ISBN 9780811854849.
- Margolies, John (photographs); Patton, Phil; Peatross, C. Ford (2010). Heimann, Jim (ed.). Roadside America. Taschen. ISBN 978-3836511735.
