= Charles Desmarais =

American art historian (born 1949)

Charles Joseph Desmarais

11th President of San Francisco Art Institute
- In office 2011 – November 1, 2015
- Preceded by: Roy Eisenhardt
- Succeeded by: Gordon Knox

Personal details
- Born: April 21, 1949 (age 76); United States
- Education: University at Buffalo (BA, MA)
- Occupation: Art critic, museum director, academic administrator

Charles Joseph Desmarais (born April 21, 1949) is an American art critic, museum director, and academic administrator. He was the art critic for the San Francisco Chronicle; and formerly served as president of the San Francisco Art Institute.

== Biography ==
Charles Joseph Desmarais was born on April 21, 1949, in the United States, and raised in The Bronx in New York City. Desmarais earned a bachelor's and master's degree from the State University of New York, Buffalo, and was a 1983 participant in the Museum Management Institute (later the Getty Leadership Institute program of the Getty Foundation).

In the 1980s, Desmarais directed the California Museum of Photography at the University of California, Riverside. He was director of the Laguna Art Museum, in Laguna Beach, California from 1988 to 1994. He then served as director of the Contemporary Arts Center in Cincinnati from 1995 until January 2004. From 2005 to 2011, he was deputy director for art at the Brooklyn Museum, where he oversaw ten curatorial departments, as well as the museum’s education, exhibitions, conservation and library activities.

In 2011, he was appointed president of the San Francisco Art Institute, a position he left on November 1, 2015.

He is married to Kitty Morgan, former editor-in-chief of Sunset magazine, and later assistant managing editor at the San Francisco Chronicle.

== Publications ==
Desmarais has curated exhibitions on various artists, photographers and architects. His books and exhibition catalogues include:

- Roger Mertin: Records 1976-78 (1978)
- Michael Bishop (1979)
- The Portrait Extended (1980)
- Why I Got into TV and Other Stories: The Art of Ilene Segalove (1990)
- Proof: Los Angeles Art and the Photograph, 1960-1980 (1992)
- Humongolous: Sculpture and Other Works by Tim Hawkinson (1996)
- Jim Dine Photographs (1999)
- Stephan Balkenhol (2000)
- Nothing Compared to This: Ambient, Incidental and New Minimal Tendencies in Current Art (2004)
- [with Markus Dochantschi] Zaha Hadid: Space for Art (2005)

== Awards ==
- 1979: Art Critics Fellowship by the National Endowment for the Arts.
- 2017: Rabkin Prize for Visual Arts Journalism.
