= Ante Bozanich =

Ante Bozanich (born March 14, 1949) is a Croatian-American video artist based in New York City.

Active since the early 1970s, Bozanich is known for his politically engaged and visually experimental works that often explore themes of memory, trauma, and the boundaries of the human condition. His practice spans analog and digital formats, and his work has been both exhibited in galleries and screened in festivals.

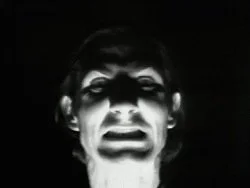
Screengrab from: I am the Light, Ante Bozanich, 1976, b&w, sound

== Biography ==
Bozanich was born in 1949. on the island of Vis, Croatia, then part of Yugoslavia as the most remote inhabited and militarized of islands. He emigrated in his early adulthood to Los Angeles where he studied and received an M.F.A. from the University of California Los Angeles. He later settled in New York City, where he continued his artistic development. Bozanich holds dual Croatian and American citizenship and has resided in New York City for several decades. He is married to art producer Daniela Bozanich.

Video art in the 1970s was a time when the medium was still emerging in the global art scene. Bozanich became part of the international wave of experimental artists who used moving images as a tool for both personal expression, media experiments and political critique.

His early works addressed themes such as nationalism, surveillance, ecological decay, and animal rights.

== Artistry ==
Bozanich's practice is rooted in a deeply personal yet universal vocabulary. His pieces often involve long, unbroken takes, static frames, or manipulated archival material, aiming to challenge conventional narrative structures. Recurring themes include exile, silence, dignity, and the relationship between nature and civilization.

Throughout his career, Bozanich has collaborated with performance artists, musicians, and architects. His visual language is noted for its poetic minimalism, interwoven with raw and emotionally charged imagery.

He has exhibited at venues including Los Angeles Contemporary Exhibitions (Los Angeles); Palais des Beaux-Arts (Brussels). Hara Museum of Contemporary Art (Tokyo), Long Beach Museum of Art (California), Centre Georges Pompidou (Paris), MoMA PS1 (NYC), Artspace, San Francisco, and his work has been featured in San Francisco International Video Festival, Image Forum (Tokyo) and the American Film Institute's National Video Festival (Los Angeles).

== Video stills ==
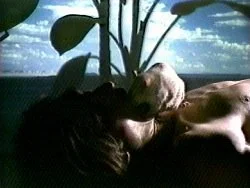

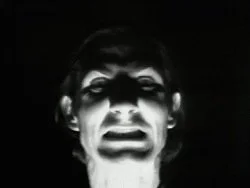

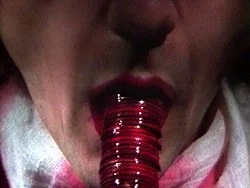

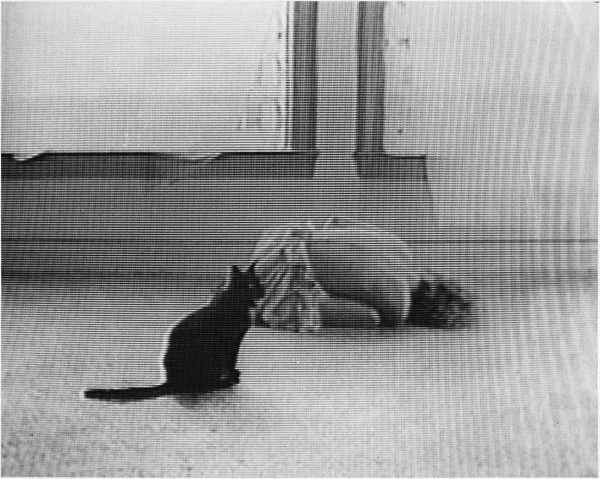

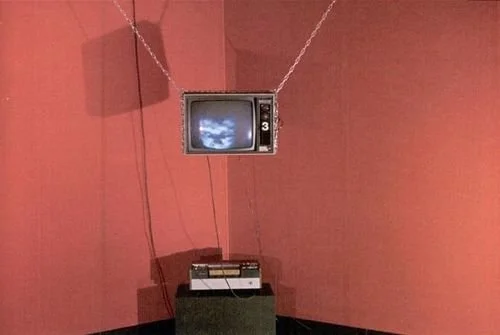

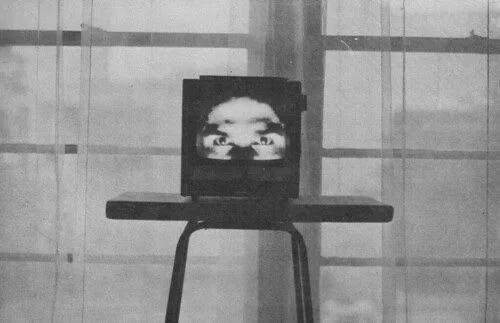
