= Joan Logue =

American video artist

Joan Logue (1942) is an American video artist. Logue was born in McKeesport, Pennsylvania.

== Career ==
Her work is included in the collection of the National Gallery of Canada, the Museum of Modern Art, New York, the ZKM Center for Art and Media Karlsruhe, the Chicago Video Data Bank and in the Museo Reina Sofia in Madrid, Spain.
