= SWR Fernsehen =

German television station

SWR
- Country: Germany
- Broadcast area: Baden-Württemberg and Rhineland-Palatinate

Programming
- Picture format: 576i (16:9 SDTV); 720p (1080p (DVB-T2 only)) (HDTV)

Ownership
- Owner: Südwestrundfunk (SWR)

History
- Launched: 5 April 1969; 57 years ago
- Former names: Südwest 3 (1969–1998); Südwest Fernsehen (1998–2006)

Links
- Website: www.swrfernsehen.de

Availability

Streaming media
- SWR Livestream: Watch Live

SWR Fernsehen is a German regional television channel targeting the states of Baden-Württemberg and Rhineland-Palatinate. It is produced by Südwestrundfunk (SWR) and is one of eight regional "third channels" broadcast by the ARD members.

== History ==
The channel started on 5 April 1969 as a collaboration between Süddeutscher Rundfunk (SDR), Südwestfunk (SWF) and SR named "Südwest 3". SDR and SWF merged in 1998 to form SWR and the channel was renamed "Südwest Fernsehen". The name "SWR Fernsehen" was adopted in September 2006.

The channel is available in two different versions:

- SWR Fernsehen BW for Baden-Württemberg.
- SWR Fernsehen RP for Rhineland-Palatinate.

The different versions broadcasts local news updates during the afternoon and a longer block with local broadcasts in the evening. About 70 percent of the programming is common, while 30 percent is broadcast regionally.

They are somewhat infamous for a series of highly graphic PSAs they produced in the 1990s and 2000s, some of which included famously violent scenes from popular movies such as Hellraiser, Pulp Fiction, American Psycho and Goodfellas. A particularly controversial PSA from 2000, Amok, used actual footage from the then-recent Columbine High School massacre, asserting a link between violent video games and violent crime.

== Selected programmes ==
- Alfons und Gäste
- Die Fallers – Die SWR Schwarzwaldserie (soap opera)
- Die Pierre M. Krause Show (late-night show)
- Landesschau Baden-Württemberg
- Landesschau Rheinland-Pfalz
- Nachtcafé (talk show)
- Report Mainz
- Sag die Wahrheit (game show)
- Spätschicht (comedy)
- Tatort (police procedural)
- Verstehen Sie Spaß?
- The Black Forest Murders (Spuren, 2025)
