= Ilene Segalove =

American artist (born 1950)

- Born: 1950; Los Angeles, California, United States
- Education: University of California, Santa Barbara
- Occupation: Conceptual artist

Ilene Segalove (born 1950) is an American conceptual artist working with appropriated images, photography and video. Her work can be understood as a precursor to The Pictures Generation.

== Career ==
=== Early life and education ===
Segalove was born and raised in Los Angeles, California, United States. She studied Fine Arts at the University of California, Santa Barbara in 1968. While studying there she met Billy Adler and John Margolies, who became her collaborators and professors and introduced her to the concept that one's personal narrative could be strong material for art. She collaborated with them on Telethon, consisting of interviews about subjects' personal experiences in relation to anthropological models presented in the University gallery as an installation made up of a living room with sofas, TV dinners and a television. But Segalove's first introduction to video was through her sculpture professor, Roland Brenner. Other early influences in using the medium of video included Wolfgang Stoerchle, a graduate student at UCSB who later taught at Cal Arts, and the curator David Ross who had come from New York and was to launch the most comprehensive video exhibition in the coming years.

Upon completion of her bachelor's degree in Fine Arts at the University of California, Santa Barbara in 1972, Segalove purchased a Sony Portapak from Nam June Paik’s girlfriend. She returned to Los Angeles and began taking classes with John Baldessari at CalArts, who encouraged Segalove to continue working with collage and to reconstruct photographs from popular culture. At Cal Arts she met David Salle, Robert Longo, and Wolfgang Stoerchle, with whom she shared ideas and collaborated. Segalove madeToday's Program: Jackson Pollock, “Lavender Mist,” (1950) (1974), Gifts/I Love You/Bel Air Menthol (1975), and If You Live Near Hollywood, You Can't Help But Look Like Some 8x10 Glossy (1976). Each of these works entailed appropriating existing imagery and collaging it, using it as is, or restaging it in such a way that shows our internalization of the message that the media was selling us.

Segalove was also exposed to feminist ideas in the Feminist Art Program at Cal Arts which encouraged her to continue to train her camera on her personal experiences. For example, Mother's Treasures (1974) was a series of photographs of her mother sitting on the patio showing different works of art that Segalove had made throughout her childhood.

=== Video Art ===
Segalove completed the graduate program in Communication Arts at Loyola Marymount University, earning her master's degree in 1975. At Loyola she honed the techniques of writing, directing and producing primarily for commercial output, but also continued making video art. She met Hildegarde Duane and they began to use each other as subjects or actors in their works. During this time The Mom Tapes, 1974–1978, in which Segalove trained her camera on her mother and their relationship, began to take shape. She was using the interviewing strategies that she had learned while making Telethon and employing the new techniques acquired in the commercial television program at Loyola. In Secret Places (1977) Segalove photographed places of personal significance to her, then printed the images so darkly that they were almost indiscernible.

In the late 1970s and early 1980s, Segalove made several works including US Treasury Nose (1979) and TV is OK (1979), The Riot Tapes: A Personal History (1984), and Female Fragments (1987). In these works, Segalove discussed her early experiences with sex, drugs, politics, and relationships, her then-boyfriend's suicide, and her experience beginning to get annual mammograms. In 1986, she made two works: Appliances and Bodyparts, both narrative sound works without visual components. Segalove's occasional use of brief interviews emulating the Vox Populi, forged her segue into radio where she was a commentator on National Public Radio for several years. Despite this shift to audio works, Segalove continued creating visual art, often with clusters of layered images sometimes interspersed with text. These included Home Entertainment Center (1987), Amnesia (1990), and Turn to Appendix (1990). A text work from the same time period, Kenny (1987), explored a childhood crush.

=== Retrospective to the present ===
In 1990, the Laguna Art Museum organized a retrospective of Segalove's work titled Ilene Segalove: Why I Got Into TV and Other Stories, encompassing much of the work that she had made since the 1970s. The exhibition included collages, photographs, photomontages, installations, video and audio works and a catalogue with essays by Charles Desmarais and Lowell Darling. A few years later, Segalove began to make large-scale works she called "wall works" including a text-based mural on the exterior wall of the Julie Rico gallery in Santa Monica, CA. She also began to manipulate imagery and text in Photoshop, then a new medium for fine artists.

In the mid-1990s, Segalove took a hiatus from making art and co-authored List Your Self, a best-selling interactive list-making journal full of varied self-exploratory prompts. She returned to art in 2008 when she was included in the Getty Center’s California Video exhibition. In 2009, Segalove had a solo exhibition at the Jancar Gallery in Los Angeles. Within a year, art collector Dean Valentine curated a show of her work at Andrea Rosen Gallery in New York. The press release for the exhibition described Segalove's work as standing "exactly halfway between Martha Rosler and Cindy Sherman."

In recent years, Segalove has continued to make artworks, including Secret Museum of Mankind (2011), in which she pairs photographic portraits of herself with historical images. Whatever Happened to My Future? (2013), is a video in which Segalove converses with a younger version of herself. Throughout the video, she describes to her younger self the historical and cultural changes that have taken place in the years between them.

== Teaching ==
Segalove taught at Otis College of Art and Design in Los Angeles from the mid-1970s to the early 1980s; University of California, San Diego and University of California, Irvine in the mid- to late-1970s; Harvard University and University of California, Santa Barbara in the late 1980s; California College of the Arts in the early 1990s; and most recently at University of California, Santa Barbara.

== Exhibitions ==
Segalove's solo exhibitions have included:

- "How to Look Prettier in a Picture," California Institute of the Arts, Valencia, CA (1973)
- "California Casual," ARCO Plaza, Los Angeles, CA (1977)
- "Videotapes by Ilene Segalove," Berkeley Art Museum, Berkeley, CA (1979)
- "History of the Twentieth Century," ARCO Center for the Visual Arts, Los Angeles, CA (1982)
- "Ilene Segalove," CEPA Gallery, Buffalo, NY (1983);
- "Why I Got into TV and Other Stories," Laguna Art Museum, Laguna Beach, CA (1990)
- "New Photographic Stories," Julie Rico Gallery, Santa Monica, CA (1993)
- "Ilene Segalove," Jancar Gallery, Los Angeles, CA (2009 & 2010)
- "The Dissatisfactions of Ilene Segalove," Andrea Rosen Gallery, New York, NY (2010)
- "Dialogues in Time," Jancar Gallery, Los Angeles, CA (2013).

Group exhibitions in which Segalove participated included:

- Whitney Biennial, Whitney Museum of American Art, New York, NY, 1975 and 1977
- "Southland Video Anthology," Long Beach Museum of Art, Long Beach, CA, 1975
- "LA from My Window," Morgan Thomas Gallery, Los Angeles, CA (1975)
- "Sequential Imagery in Photography," Broxton Gallery, Los Angeles, CA (1976)
- "Social Commentary," Woman's Building, Los Angeles, CA (1976)
- "Hildegarde Duane and Ilene Segalove," Los Angeles Institute of Contemporary Art, Los Angeles, CA (1977)
- "Seven Evenings of Video by Women," Woman's Building, Los Angeles, CA (1977)
- "American Narrative/Story Art," Contemporary Arts Museum, Houston, TX (1978)
- "Southern California Video Invitational 1979," University of Southern California, Los Angeles, CA (1979)
- "New West," The Kitchen, New York, NY (1979)
- "The Altered Photograph," P.S. 1, Long Island City, NY (1979).

Segalove's video work has also featured in group exhibitions:

- "Video Art: The Electronic Medium,” Museum of Contemporary Art, Chicago, IL (1980)
- "InsideOut: Self Beyond Likeness,” Newport Harbor Art Museum, Newport Beach, CA (1981)
- "Some Contemporary Portraits," Contemporary Art Museum, Houston, TX (1982)
- "New Narrative," Museum of Modern Art, New York, NY (1983)
- "The People Next Door," Los Angeles Contemporary Exhibitions, Los Angeles, CA (1984)
- "Video from Vancouver to San Diego," Museum of Modern Art, New York, NY (1985)
- "The Arts for Television," Museum of Contemporary Art, Los Angeles, CA (1987)
- "Avant-Garde in the Eighties," Los Angeles County Museum of Art, Los Angeles, CA (1987)
- "Identity: Representations of the Self,” Whitney Museum of Art, New York, NY, (1989)
- “Suburban Home Life: Tracking the American Dream,” Whitney Museum of Art, New York NY (1989)
- "Women in Video, Pioneers," Long Beach Museum of Art, Long Beach, CA (1994)
- "P.L.A.N.: Photography Los Angeles Now," Los Angeles County Museum of Art, Los Angeles, CA (1996).

Segalove was included in several group exhibitions of artists working in Los Angeles and California from the 1970s, including:

- California Video, The J. Paul Getty Museum, Los Angeles, CA, 2008
- Under the Big Black Sun: California Art 1974–1981, Museum of Contemporary Art, Los Angeles, CA, 2011
- State of Mind: New California Art Circa 1970, Orange County Museum of Art, Newport Beach, CA, 2011
- Segalove + Duane + Mogul, Jancar Gallery, Los Angeles, CA, 2011
- Everyday Epiphanies: Photography and Daily Life Since 1969, The Metropolitan Museum of Art, New York, NY, 2013.

Segalove's work has been included in international invitational exhibitions, including:

- 30th São Paulo Art Biennial, "The Immanence of Poetics," São Paulo, Brazil (2012)
- "Biennale Cuvée," OÖ Kulturquartier, Linz, Austria (2013)
- "The Second Sex," Centre d’art Contemporain de Noisy-le-Sec, Paris, France (2013).

== Collections ==
Segalove's works are held in numerous private and public collections including the Museum of Modern Art, Metropolitan Museum of Art, and the Jewish Museum in the New York area; the Hammer Museum, J. Paul Getty Museum, Museum of Contemporary Art, Los Angeles County Museum of Art, the Santa Barbara Museum of Art, and the Laguna Art Museum in the region of Southern California; and elsewhere such as the Museum of Fine Arts in Houston, the High Museum of Art in Atlanta and the Walker Art Center in Minneapolis.

== Recognition ==
During each of the last four decades of the 20th century, Segalove received National Endowment for the Arts grants for her work in Photography, Video, Media, and Radio. She also received the Young Talent Award from the Los Angeles County Museum of Art, along with the Filmmaker Award from the American Film Institute, the Contemporary Artist's TV fund, and the Corporation for Public Broadcasting award throughout the decade of the 80s.
