= Daniel Reeves (artist) =

American video artist

- Born: 1948; Washington, D.C.
- Occupation: Visual artist, video artist, photographer, installation artist
- Awards: Guggenheim Fellowship

Daniel Reeves (born 1948 in Washington, DC) is an American video artist, poet, and sculptor. He has won three Emmy Awards for his work.

During the Vietnam War, Reeves served as a Marine who was stationed at the Demilitarized Zone between North and South Vietnam. He was critically injured in 1968 during an ambush of his platoon. This event has been one of the key influences in his work as an artist.

== Education ==
Reeves received a Bachelor of Art degree and an Associate in Science degree from Ithaca College.

== Selected exhibitions ==
Reeves' work has been exhibited at the Louvre Museum, Paris, the Whitney Museum of American Art, New York, the Tate Gallery, London, Documenta 7, Kassel, Germany, among other venues.

His work is represented by Electronic Arts Intermix, and Video Data Bank.

== Awards and honors ==
Reeves has received six grants from the National Endowment for the Arts, a Guggenheim Fellowship, a United States/Japan Exchange Fellowship, as well as three grants from the New York State Council on the Arts. He receive a Rockefeller Inter-cultural Fellowship in Video in 1995. Reeves has won three Emmy Awards for his 1981 video Smothering Dreams, based on various realities and myths about warfare as well as his own direct experiences in Vietnam.

== Collections ==
His work is held in the permanent collections of the Museum of Modern Art, San Francisco Museum of Modern Art, the Fralin Museum of Art, the University of the Arts, London, the Stedelijk Museum Amsterdam, ZKM | Center for Art and Media Karlsruhe among others.
