= Four More Years =

1972 film

Four More Years is a 1972 documentary covering the 1972 Republican National Convention produced by Top Value Television. The title of the film refers to Richard Nixon's re-election slogan. The convention named Nixon as the Presidential nominee and Spiro Agnew as the nominee for Vice President. All filming takes place on the site of the convention center in Miami Beach, Florida. It was TVTV's second production, after The World's Largest TV Studio (1972), which covered the Democratic Convention one month earlier.

== Content ==
Four More Years was part of the guerrilla television movement. While the filmmakers do not hide their leftist sympathies, neither do they try to ridicule and instead allow all parties to express themselves. In general, the documentary avoids coverage of staged events such as performances and speeches. Instead, the camera offers a behind-the-scenes look at the staging of the event. The film utilizes shots of the convention hotel and the convention floor in both filled and empty states. Interviews are conducted in an informal, spontaneous style by Skip Blumberg and Maureen Orth. Interviews are also punctuated by irreverent moments like Blumberg playing the harmonica on the convention floor.

The film avoids voice-over commentary or added music. Instead, still shots of official campaign buttons or other political buttons are used to provide context for the interviews. Campaign buttons include "Get to know a Nixonette", "Nixon's the One!", and "One of 250,000". Buttons from protesters of the event include “Vietnam Veterans Against the War”, "Acid Amnesty Appeasement Vote McGovern", and "McGovern for President of North Vietnam".

Politicians and their family members are interviewed throughout. Interviews were conducted with Nixon's daughters Julie Nixon Eisenhower and Tricia Nixon Cox, as well as Tricia Cox's husband, Edward Cox. The camera does not follow the cues of the interviewee and instead tries to extend the interview as long as possible, following Cox as he retreats into a private section of the convention floor. For the most part the film chooses to show politicians in transitional or unofficial moments rather than on stage of the official event program. For example, as Henry Kissinger gets into a vehicle, Maureen Orth asks him, "How are the girls?" to which he replies, "They're very pleasant". One exception is an extended scene of Ronald Reagan giving a speech to the Young Republicans with a young woman hollering in the front of the audience. Members of the Young Republicans are interviewed and express indignation about media reports that their participation in the event is arranged by the Republican Party rather than being self-organized.

Unlike typical convention coverage, the TVTV crew sought opinions from news teams as well as politicians. TVTV asked questions relating not only about the event but about news coverage in general. On the convention floor the crew interviews Cassie Mackin, Tom Pettit, and Douglas Kiker from NBC, Herb Kaplow from ABC, and Mike Wallace and Roger Mudd from CBS. Of these personalities, only Roger Mudd refuses to answer TVTV's questions. There is also a longer interview with CBS anchor Walter Cronkite in an editing room in which he defends his decision, which Reagan had criticized, to not stand for the national anthem due to his journalistic duties. Cronkite also recommends that viewers glean their news from multiple sources and critically examine these sources for a functional democracy.

The last major group featured in the film is protesters outside the convention, which includes both student protesters and Vietnam Veterans Against the War. The location of the convention was moved from San Diego to Miami in response to concerns about Vietnam protests in California. Among the crowd of anti-war veterans in the film is the activist Ron Kovic. The atmosphere outside the hotel is much different than within: the national guard is present, tear gas is used, and the film shows a congressman having trouble getting into the Convention Center due to the heightened security. Republican bystanders criticize the protesting veterans. The film concludes by juxtaposing Kovic shouting, "Stop the bombing! Stop killing! Stop the war!" with Republican delegates popping the balloons falling from the ceiling after the announcement of Nixon's confirmed candidacy.

== Production ==
Michael Shamberg founded TVTV for the purpose of filming the 1972 Democratic National Convention and released The World's Largest TV Studio, a film with a similar sensibility. A positive New York Times review of The World's Largest TV Studio encouraged TVTV to continue the project and cover the Republican convention as well. The production of Four More Years was a collaboration with other technical and artistic groups, including videofreex.

The production crew was composed of Wendy Appel, Skip Blumberg, Nancy Cain, Steve Christiansen, Michael Couzens, Bart Friedman, Chuck Kennedy, Chip Lord, Anda Korsts, Maureen Orth, Hudson Marquez, Martha Miller, T.L. Morey, Allen Rucker, Ira Schneider, Michael Shamberg, Jodi Sibert, Tom Weinberg, and Megan Williams.

== Reception ==
Throughout September and October 1972, Four More Years was broadcast by Group W, New York's WOR-TV, San Francisco's KQED, as well as stations in Boston, Baltimore, Pittsburgh, and Philadelphia. The documentary was well received by critics and pundits across party lines. One critic lauded TVTV's ability to produce a successful and compelling portrait "for the money CBS spent on coffee."

Four More Years was the first independently produced feature shown in its entirety on national television. Some people in the movie claimed that they did not know that the camera was wide-angled and therefore did not know they were in the shot. Additionally, the use of the Portapak, a much smaller device than typical news cameras, likely helped the crew film inconspicuously.

The film has been the topic of media and art historical studies for its role in the history of counterculture media.

== See also ==
- List of American films of 1972
