= Anda Korsts =

American journalist

Anda Korsts (July 2, 1942 – February 24, 1991) was a Chicago-based video artist and journalist. She was the founder of Videopolis, Chicago's first alternative video space, and worked with TVTV, a national video collective. She was one of the first of many new artists to use the portable camcorder as a tool for art making and radical journalism.

== Personal life ==
Anda Korsts was born on July 2, 1942, in Riga, Latvia. The family left German-occupied Latvia during World War II before the second Soviet occupation, moving west until they eventually reached American-occupied Germany. Their home was a displaced persons camp in Hanau, near Frankfurt. In 1950, Anda and her family emigrated to Hyannis, Massachusetts. Her mother was a dentist, and her father became a Certified Public Accountant (CPA). In 1956, the family moved from Boston to Chicago. Anda Korsts was married to a successful Loop lawyer and the pair had three children; the marriage ended in divorce. Throughout Korsts career, her Latvian background instilled motives for the documentation and preservation of ethnic cultural experiences which were being integrated into American culture. Moreover, this shaped her ideology and her strong relationship with film as a medium. On February 24, 1991 Korsts died at the age of 48 in her Lincoln Park home.

== Career ==
Anda began her career around the early 1970s as a journalist covering events and conventions. With the turn of the 1970s, she left her previous job with WBBM and began working with TVTV with other video pioneer and visionary Tom Weinberg. Chicago was the second video hub next to New York City which already had made cable available to all residents. Anda was one among many other artists of this decade experimenting in Chicago. The Sony Portipak was the technology that democratized the medium to a feasible and sensible tool. By 1973 Anda collected grants from the Art Council, North Lawndale Economic Development Corporation, and the Latvian Magazine. Korsts had raised enough funds to produce a video collective named Videopolis.

=== Videopolis ===
Videopolis is considered to be Chicago's first comprehensive video project, giving information to the public about videos. Her partners included Lilly Ollinger and Jack McFadden. They trained students how to use video equipment and how to make their videos an essential part to their programs. They also tried to provide as much equipment as they could obtain, for the purpose of allowing the public to use the equipment. Over the years, Videopolis focused on some topics that would cover important stories and uses of video. In 1972, the group decided to focus on experimentation with five uses of tape:

- Education
- Community organization
- Arts documentation
- Historical documentation
- Archiving

Another one of their activities consisted of promoting the importance of women in video and film. They created a program called, Women Doing Video and would collect video pieces by women and submit them to film festivals. Corporate sponsorship came about and the program was soon changed to Women's Video Festival. Most of their projects dealt with the issues related to women's rights. These tapes would show stories of women who had gotten illegal abortions, a national lesbian conference, the making of a centerfold, the Miss California pageant, chronicling a childbirth, etc. Videopolis also documented the Chicago Imagists, a school of artists. This project was funded by the Illinois Arts Council. With their handheld cameras and portable video technology, the crew was able to film in the artists' studios instead of a television studio. The Chicago Imagists were interviewed for their artwork by the crew.

Videopolis closed after Korsts started working on a series, It's a Living, which was picked up by the Public Broadcasting System. Gundega Korsts, Anda's sister, noted that she closed Videopolis because: "She went to Disneyland and saw everyone with a TV camera, and she said, 'It's time to move on to something else.'"

==== It's a Living ====
While working on the series, Korsts stated that, "I would like to take TV out of its slick-chrome studio and into people's lives, make it less elitist, more democratic." It's a Living, revolved around the lives and daily routines of people in working-class America. The series consisted of six hour long programs that aired on Public Broadcasting Television on Channel 11 (WTTV) in the late 1970s. The idea for the project was based on Studs Terkel's oral history book, Working. The interviews are all with personalities around Chicago that make up of average working class citizens of the mid 1970s. The series changed television by putting the garbage man, truck driver, or factory workers face, "on screen as well as in front of the tube". Each segment contained a different individual person. The work allowed for exposure of unexplored ideologies to the public, in an un-censored and unbiassed way. The work additionally functioned as an archive of the simultaneously existing working-class ideologies of It's a Living's context.

=== TVTV ===
TVTV, also known as Top Value Television, was video collective that lasted from 1972 to 1977. The group was founded by Allen Rucker, Michael Shamberg, Tom Weinberg, Hudson Marquez and Megan Williams. Korsts was a producer. In 1972, Korsts was part of the crew that took hand-held cameras to the Miami Democratic and Republican conventions. They recorded the behind-the-scenes politics which resulted in the documentaries Four More Years (1972) and The World's Largest TV Studio (1972). These documentaries were edited into a one-hour program that became the first independently produced program to air on US television at the time.

=== Four More Years ===
In Four More Years, Anda Korsts navigates the event as a journalist gathering different political perspectives and personalities. Anda Korst, worked with TVTV and Antfarm video collective's team consisting of containing Wendy Appel, Skip Blumberg, Nancy Cain, Steve Christiansen, Michael Couzens, Bart Friedman, Chuck Kennedy, Chip Lord, Maureen Orth, Hudson Marquez, Martha Miller, T.L. Morey, Alan Rucker, Ira Schneider, Michael Shamberg, Jodi Silbert, Tom Weinberg and Megan Williams. Using the held Sony Portapak (portable video camera), Anda, TVTV's collective, and members of Antfarm captured documentation of the political convention's conversation's that undermined the perspective of broadcasting companies and slanted politics at campaign. The video was later separately put on public television within an interview conducted by Marty Robinson with both TVTVs Anda Korsts and Tom Weinberg. This contained a few pieces from Four more Years . The clips highlight her conducting non-conventional interviews with the different supporters, protestors, and even broadcasting entities. The Portapak video technology made their success possible—allowing collective members to access sections at the event that were otherwise off limits to large production companies.

=== The Artaud Project ===
Anda Korsts was videographer and co-producer of The Artaud Project, a theater event by James Rinnert that involved one actor, J. Pat Miller as Artaud, interacting with video projected on five screens on stage to portray the life and artistic struggles of the influential theater artist Antonin Artaud. The Artaud Project was performed through January 1980 at the Victory Gardens Theater in Chicago, after Korsts and Rinnert had worked for more than a year to bring it to the stage. It was directed by Rinnert with additional scene direction by Dennis Zacek and Mac McGinnes. Scenic design by Mary Griswold, lighting by Geoffrey Bushor and image processing by Mark Fausner were essential elements of the show, which won a special Joseph Jefferson award for "Extraordinary Theater Production." Miller was also nominated for a Best Actor award by the Joseph Jefferson committee for his performance. Miller's stage performance, Korsts's video work and the image processing used to help visually depict Artaud's mental illness and drug experiences, made the experimental production unique in Chicago's world-class theater.

== Filmography ==
Year	Film	Involvement
1971	Muzeeka part 1, camera 1	Producer
1971	Muzeeka part 1, camera 2	Producer
1971	Muzeeka part 2, camera 1	Producer
1971	Muzeeka part 2, camera 2	Producer
1972	Warpathon II	Producer
1972	Turds In Hell, Part I	Producer
1972	Turds In Hell, Part II	Producer
1972	Second City Relics	Videomaker
1973	Warp Discussion, Part I	Producer
1973	Warp Discussion, Part II	Producer
1973	Night School	Producer
1974?/1976?	White House Halloween with Betty Ford	Sound, Interviewer, Performer
1974	Bloody Bess, Part I	Producer
1974	Bloody Bess, Part II	Producer
1974	Bloody Bess, Part III	Producer
1975	Studs Terkel with Nelson Algren	Producer, Camera
1975	It's A Living	Producer
1976	It's a Living: The Unemployment Line	Producer, Camera, Sound
1976	It's a Living: Barney	Producer
1976	It's a Living: Sally, Terri, Dawn	Producer
1980	The Artaud Project	Video Director, Producer
1982	Chris Bliss performing The Rock	Producer, Camera
1982	Near North Montessori #1	Producer, Camera
1982	Near North Montessori #2	Producer, Camera
1982	Near North Montessori #3	Producer, Camera
1982	Near North Montessori #4	Producer, Camera
1982	Near North Montessori #5	Producer, Camera
1982	Near North Montessori #6	Producer, Camera
