= Megan Williams (filmmaker) =

American film producer

Megan Williams is an American film producer, director, and advocate for the deaf.

== Career ==
Williams worked as a television journalist. Williams was an adjunct professor at the USC School of Cinematic Arts.

In 1972, Williams, along with Allen Rucker, Michael Shamberg, Tom Weinberg, and Hudson Marquez, co-founded the video collective: TVTV, a collective of documentary filmmakers who ran guerrilla television.

Williams was awarded the 1974 "Alfred I. du Pont/Columbia University Award in Broadcast Journalism" (DuPont Award) for her work on the documentary: Lord of the Universe.

In 1988 Williams produced Language Says It All, a film about the lives of parents and deaf children. Language Says It All was nominated for an Academy Award for Best Documentary Short.

For her long-term commitment in the field of deaf advocacy, Williams received the Lee Katz Award from the American Society for Deaf Children. Williams is one of the co-founders of the online platform Tripod, a platform geared toward the education and support of deaf people via appropriate materials and advice. Williams founded Tripod in 1982 and is herself the mother of two deaf children.

In 2006, Williams made her directorial debut with Tell Me Cuba.

Williams was married to producer Michael Shamberg.

== See also ==
- Deaf rights movement
- Telecommunications for the deaf
