= The Good Times Are Killing Me =

The Good Times Are Killing Me may refer to:

- "The Good Times Are Killing Me", a song by Modest Mouse on their album Good News for People Who Love Bad News
- The Good Times Are Killing Me, a book written by Lynda Barry, later turned into an off-Broadway play
- The Good Times Are Killing Me, the 2009 Canadian made-for-television movie produced by Shaftesbury Films
- The Good Times Are Killing Me, the 1975 documentary by TVTV (video collective)
