= Parry Teasdale =

- Education: Colgate University (dropped out)
- Known for: Video Art, Videofreex

Parry Teasdale is an American video artist and a founding member of the early video collective Videofreex. He was also involved with Lanesville TV, one of the first unlicensed TV stations, throughout the 1970s.

== Role in founding Videofreex ==
Teasdale attended the Woodstock music festival during the summer of 1969 where he met and became friends with future Videofreex co-founder David Cort. Both having brought video equipment, the pair collaborated in filming the festival, placing emphasis on the crowds rather than the musical performers in their footage. After an unsuccessful attempt to sell the Woodstock tapes to the CBS news program 60 Minutes, Teasdale moved to Manhattan to found Videofreex along with Cort and Cort's then-girlfriend Curtis Ratcliff (Boyle 1997, p. 15).

CBS executive Don West quickly became interested in the newly formed group's work, particularly their portrayals of youth and 1960s counterculture. He funded the shooting of the pilot of a new program that might replace The Smothers Brothers Comedy Hour, which had recently been cancelled. The network declined to pick up the finished project, titled Subject to Change, deeming it too radical for network television, and the screening of the pilot at the group's Prince Street loft led to the executive's walking out and Don West being fired. Due to the high cost of rent in SoHo, several members of Videofreex including Teasdale decided to leave the city but remain part of the collective.

== Early work in unlicensed television ==
Having received a grant of $40,000 from the Rochester Museum and Science Center, several Videofreex moved to Maple Tree Farm, a large house in Lanesville, a rural village located in the southern part of Hunter, New York in the Catskill Mountains. Here, they began to produce live "narrowcasts" (Boyle 1997, p. 88) for the local community every Saturday night, and the Lanesville TV project became the first unauthorized television program, eventually becoming a legal public access channel. This eventually led to funding from the New York State Council of the Arts (NYSCA), which awarded the group money in 1971, after NYSCA received an allotment of 20.2 million dollars from the New York State legislature. NYSCA began a program designed to distribute funds across the state to rural communities instead of letting all of the funds to be absorbed by New York City. After the collective dissolved in 1978, Teasdale worked as a U.S. Federal Communications Commission consultant in its investigation of the legality of low power television.

== Involvement with TVTV ==
Teasdale collaborated with San Francisco-based video collective TVTV. He contributed to the editing of the independent documentary The World's Largest TV Studio, (Boyle 1997, p. 87), which provided coverage of the 1972 Democratic National Convention in Miami Beach, Florida. This work became the first broadcast television program to be shot with portable equipment. Teasdale did not participate in the production of its Republican counterpart, Four More Years, instead turning his attention to independent television in his pursuit of liveness and the unconventional (Boyle 1997, p. 44).

== After Videofreex ==
In the 1980s, Teasdale went into the publishing industry and has held positions as editor of The Woodstock Times and The Independent. As of 2015, he was working as editor and publisher of The Columbia Paper, an independent newspaper based in Ghent, New York. He also wrote Videofreex: America's First Pirate TV Station: The Catskills Collective That Turned It On (1999), an insider's account of the collective, and led the Videofreex in the collaboration The Spaghetti City Video Manual (1973), a technical guide to video equipment.
