= Mary Curtis Ratcliff =

American visual artist

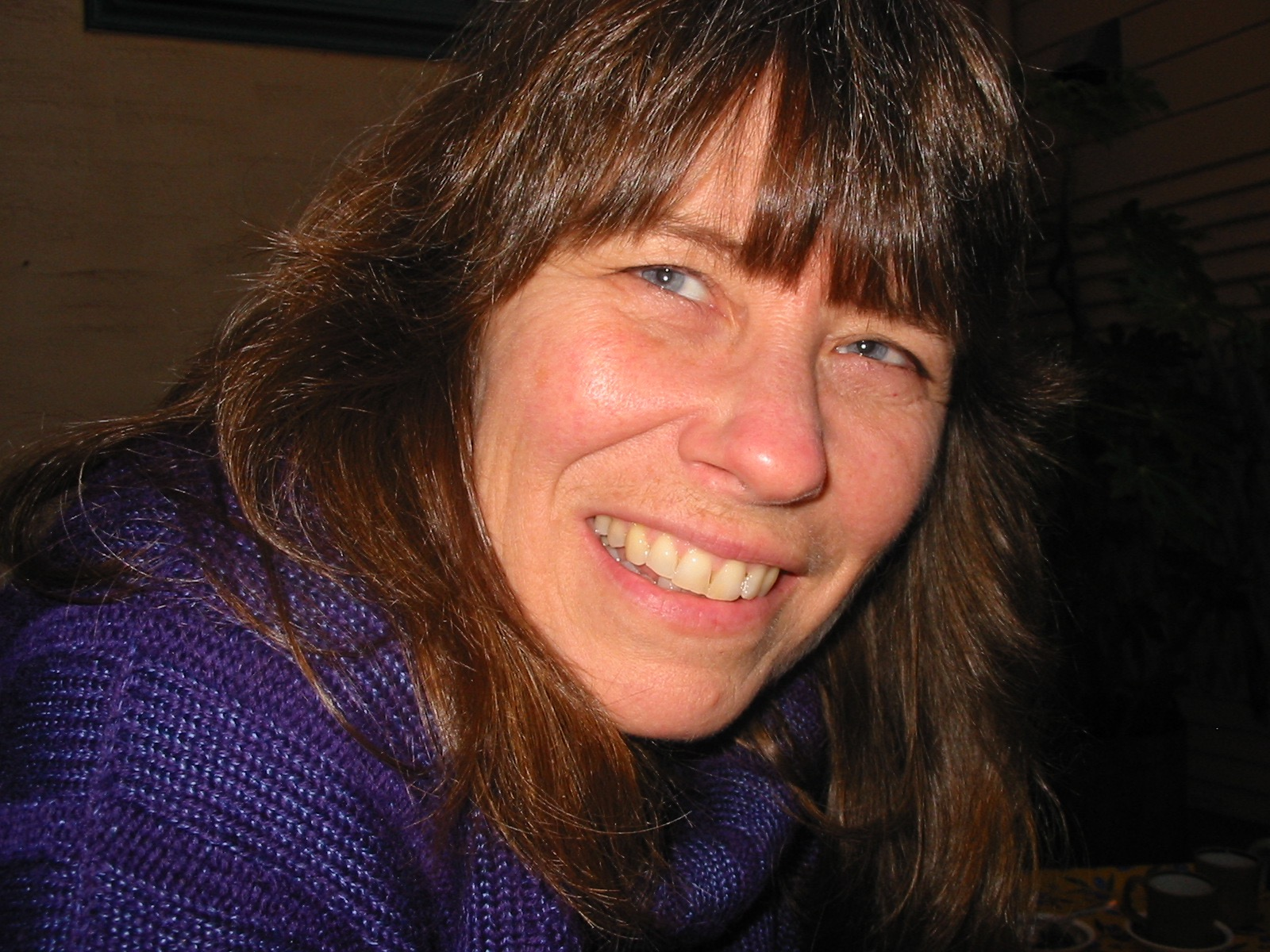
- Born: 1942 (age 83–84); Chicago, Illinois, US
- Education: Rhode Island School of Design
- Occupation: Artist
- Spouses: Cyril Joseph Griffin (m. 1972; div. 1973) Peter Samis (m. 2017)
- Website: www.marycurtisratcliff.com

Mary Curtis Ratcliff (born 1942) is an American visual artist.

== Early life ==
Mary Curtis Ratcliff was born in Chicago and grew up in Birmingham, Michigan. She attended the Rhode Island School of Design and graduated with a Bachelor of Fine Arts degree in 1967.

She moved to New York, living with artist David Cort on Rivington Street. After Cort met Parry Teasdale while shooting video at Woodstock in 1969, the three founded a collective which came to be known as the Videofreex. The group's early endeavors included covering countercultural subjects in Manhattan and California, and a trip to Chicago to interview Yippie leader Abbie Hoffman and Black Panther leader Fred Hampton, providing an alternate perspective to that of mainstream television. This footage was hastily compiled into a pilot for a prospective CBS television magazine series titled Subject to Change. However, after an unconventional screening at the Videofreex loft in lower Manhattan, network executives declined to move forward with the project.

Another of the group's videos was Curtis' Abortion, in which Ratcliff and two other women members of the Freex candidly discussed an abortion Ratcliff underwent in 1970, shortly after the procedure had been legalized in New York, contrasting that experience with previous illegal ones they had undergone.

The Freex moved to Upstate New York in 1971 to avail themselves of New York State Council on the Arts grants and eventually developed a pirate television station named Lanesville TV that operated out of their commune on Maple Tree Farm. Ratcliff, increasingly disillusioned with collective life and decision-making, married Cy Griffin and left the collective at this point.

All the guys showed up and me. We sat in a circle and we all talked. And I said something. And I was totally ignored. And I said it again ... the guys probably don't remember it, but I certainly do. And I was totally ignored. And I looked around and said I am really over this. I can't be a part of a group where no one can give me any type of dialogue, any respect. That is when I started walking out the door.

She collaborated with Griffin on a multi-projector synchronized slideshow with sound called Daze of Syracuse: Past, Present and Future at the Everson Museum, visited the Rosebud and Pine Ridge Reservations with him in South Dakota, documenting and engaging in the Sundance Ceremonies with the Lakota Sioux in 1971 and 1972. After that, she moved to California, divorced Griffin, and resumed her career as an individual artist.

== Artistic career ==
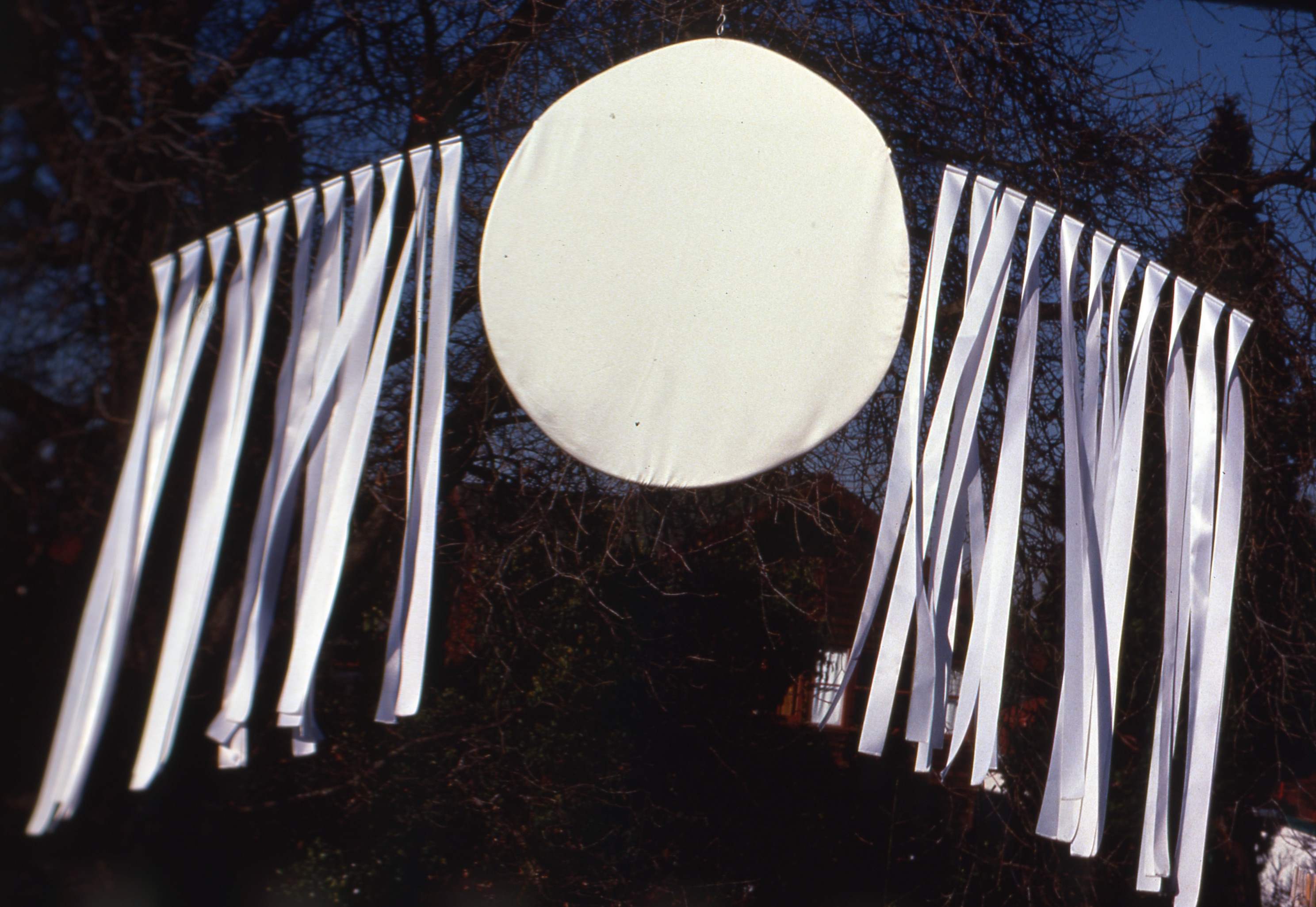
Amelia (1972), a tribute to Amelia Earhart

Ratcliff's early artistic work focused on sculpture. In the 1970s she produced kinetic figures made from hoops and ribbons. Many of her works from this time were used in processions and dances by the emergent Goddess movement, and her aerial sculpture Amelia, an homage to Amelia Earhart, hung over the stage at the "Great Goddess Re-emerging" Conference at the University of California, Santa Cruz. In the mid-1980s she worked at Industrial Light & Magic, feathering costume heads for the film Howard the Duck. Later freestanding sculptures of the early 1990s, such as Josephine, an homage to Josephine Baker, took on abstracted standing goddess forms. She later moved on to smaller works, such as a series based on the form of decorated cakes, titled Mixed Messages.

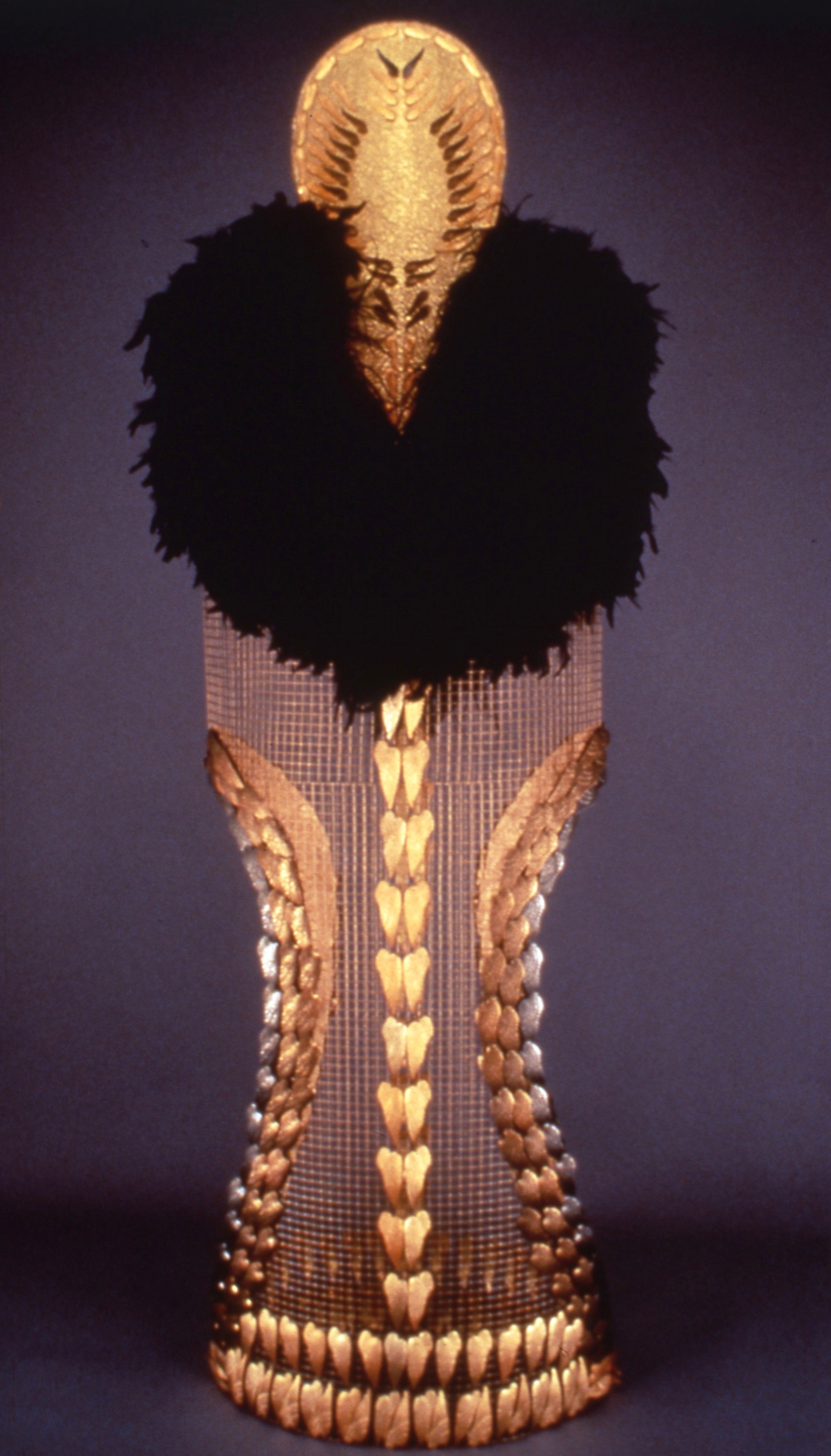
Josephine (1992), a tribute to Josephine Baker

At the suggestion of artist Helène Aylon, she participated in residency programs at the Virginia Center for the Creative Arts in 1997 and 1999. At these she began to transition from working mainly in sculpture to two-dimensional mixed media. Over the next 20 years, her artistic technique grew to include layered elements of drawing, collage, image transfer, and photography. Beginning in 2016, Ratcliff began combining her focus on nature-based imagery using mixed media techniques with a return to kinetic sculpture, notably in the exhibitions Full Circle, What Goes Around Comes Around, and Circumference.

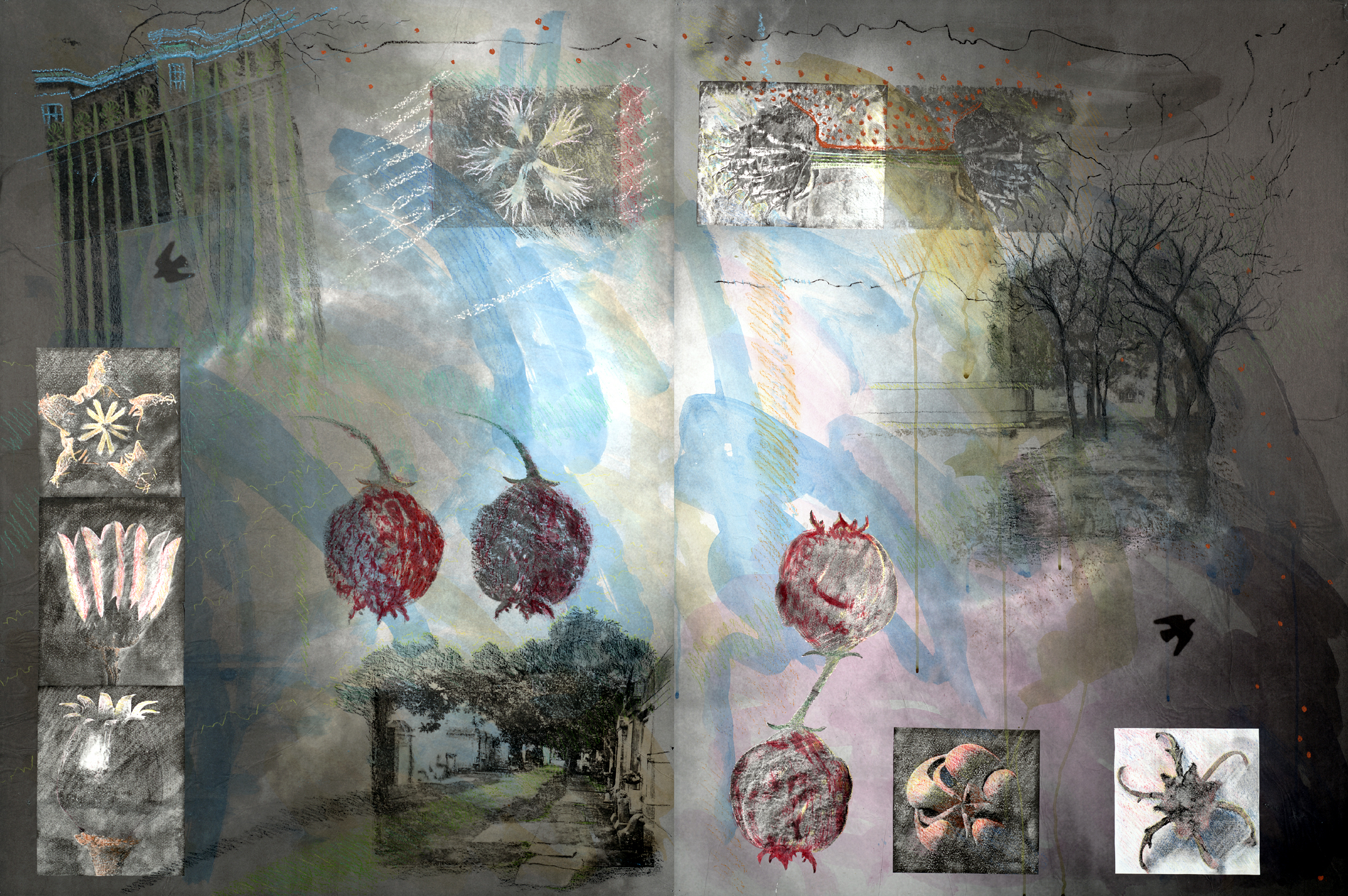
Two Birds, 1999

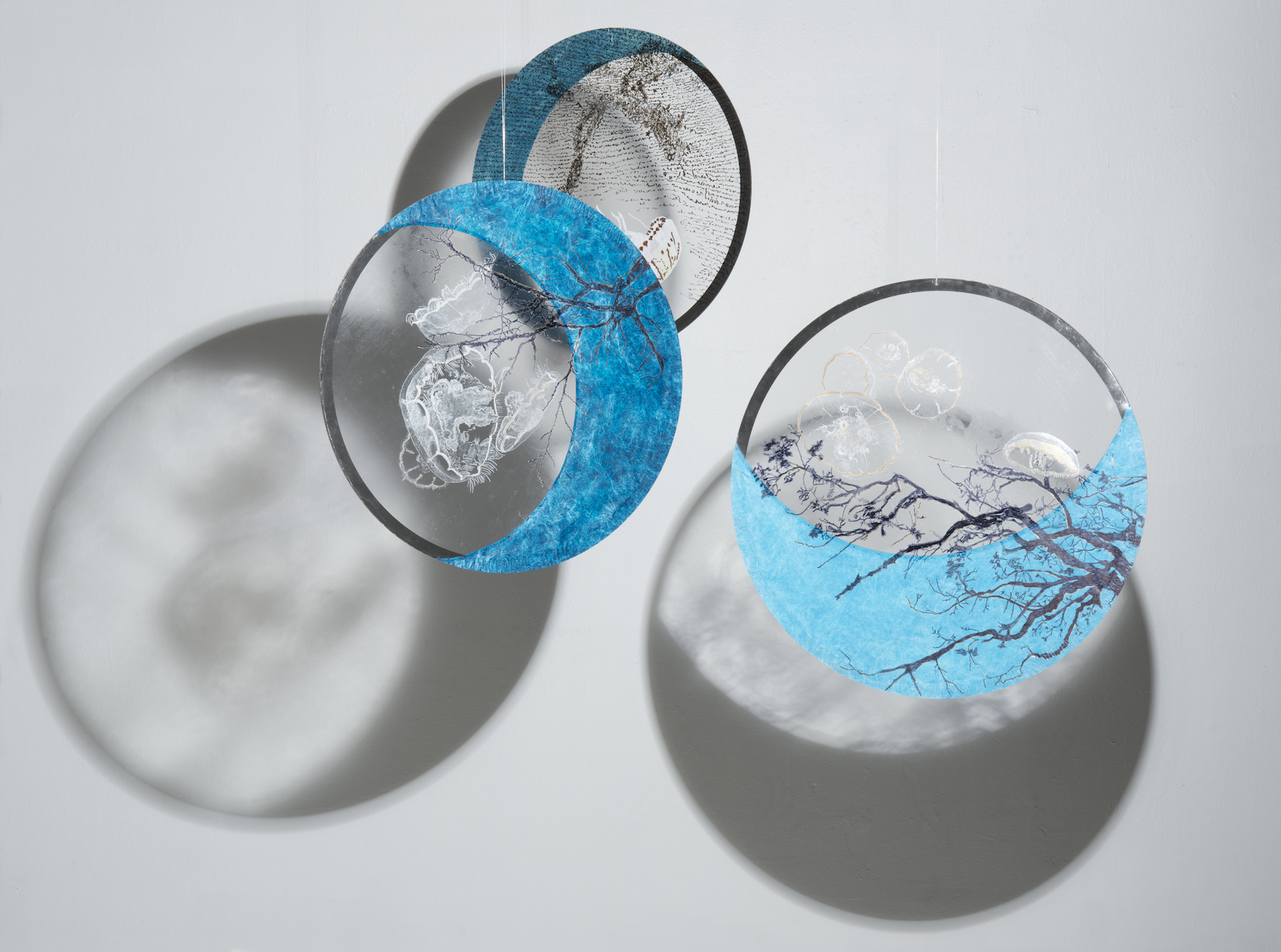
Jellies, 2018

Her work is included in the collections of the Oakland Museum of California and the Fine Arts Museums of San Francisco.

Ratcliff is a member of the National Organization for Arts in Health In 2018, she launched the website Healing Circle Artworks to explore the placement of art in hospitals and public spaces.

In 2019 she was awarded a Civic Arts Grant by the city of Berkeley.

In October 2023, her works Koi and Waterborne Tree were featured in the exhibit Couplet Pair Rebus: The Principle of Cause and Effect in Art at the University Museum and Art Gallery, Hong Kong.

== Personal life ==
Mary Curtis Ratcliff lives in Berkeley, California with her husband, SFMOMA curator Peter Samis.

== Selected solo exhibitions ==
- 1974, Opening Exhibition, San Francisco Women's Art Center, San Francisco, CA
- 1982, Ribbon Sculpture, Sonoma State University Library Gallery, Rohnert Park, CA
- 1993, Mary Curtis Ratcliff, University of the Pacific Gallery, Stockton, CA
- 1994, On the Wall, Standing Tall, Solano Community College, Suisun, CA
- 1994, Ritual Fashion, Meridian Gallery, San Francisco, CA
- 1996, Unlikely Sculpture, Santa Rosa Junior College, Petaluma, CA
- 2000, Memory Park, Coal Shed Studio Gallery, Mare Island, CA
- 2000, Ten Days in Shimabara, Gentoshiya Gallery, Shimabara, Japan
- 2001, Transfer of Memory, Art Foundry Gallery, Sacramento, CA
- 2005, Surface Fancy, State of California Craft & Cultural Arts Gallery, Oakland, CA
- 2006, Arborescence, Art Scape Gallery, Walnut Creek, CA
- 2009, Patterns of Emergence, Hess Gallery, Pine Manor College, Chestnut Hill, MA
- 2012, Divine: A Miscellany of Timeless Works, Mercury 20 Gallery, Oakland, CA
- 2015, Arborescence: Art in the Vineyard, Moulds Family Vineyard, Napa, CA
- 2016, Full Circle, Mercury 20 Gallery, Oakland, CA
- 2017, What Goes Around Comes Around, Mercury 20 Gallery, Oakland, CA
- 2018, Circumference, Mercury 20 Gallery, Oakland, CA
- 2019, Berkeley Civic Center Art Show
- 2020, Scrapworks, Mercury 20 Gallery, Oakland, CA
- 2021, Tree of Life: Symbol and Reality, SIY Gallery, San Francisco, CA

== Works ==
- Mayday Realtime, film (1971)
- Arborescence, book (2008)
- Small Worlds, book (2010)
- Full Circle, book (ISBN 9781367857766, 2016)
