= Laurie Garrett =

American science journalist and author (born 1951)

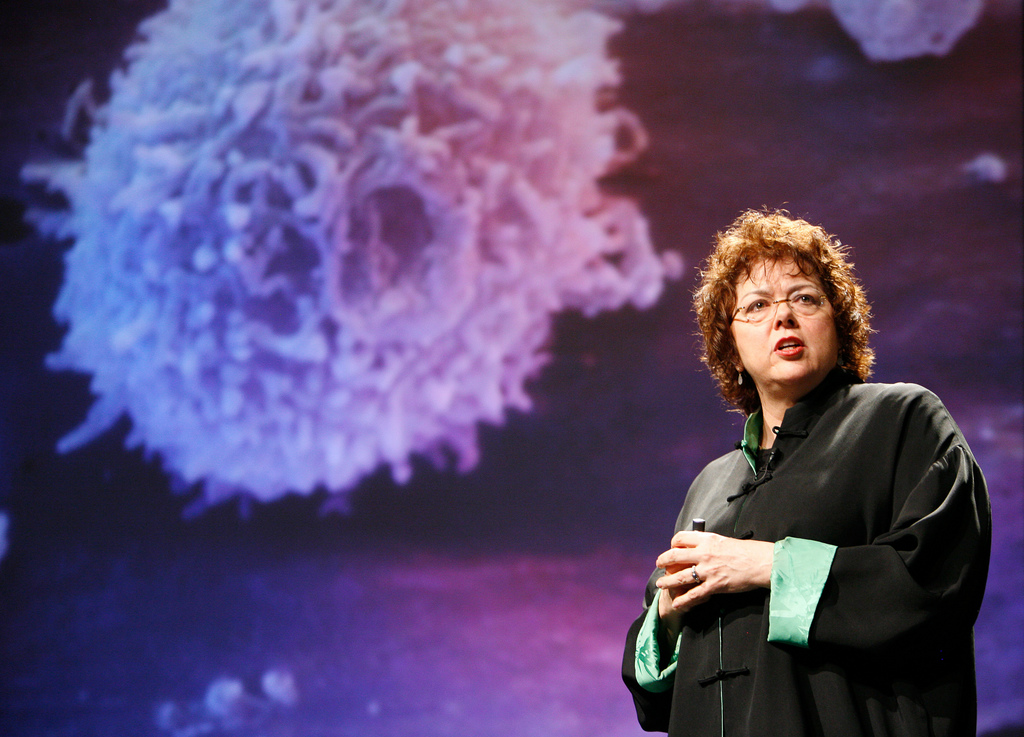
- Garrett at the 2008 Poptech conference
- Born: 1951 (age 74–75); Los Angeles, California, U.S.
- Education: University of California, Santa Cruz (BS)
- Occupations: Science journalist; Author
- Writing career
- Notable awards: Peabody Award; Polk Award; Pulitzer Prize
- Website: lauriegarrett.com

Laurie Garrett (born 1951) is an American science journalist and author. She was awarded the Pulitzer Prize for Explanatory Journalism in 1996 for a series of works published in Newsday that chronicled the Ebola virus outbreak in Zaire.

== Biography ==
Laurie Garrett was born in Los Angeles, California, in 1951. She was graduated from San Marino High School in 1969. She earned a B.S. degree in biology with honors from Merrill College at the University of California, Santa Cruz, in 1975. Garrett enrolled in a Ph.D. program in the department of bacteriology and immunology at the University of California, Berkeley, but abandoned her studies to be a journalist.

=== Professional career ===
At KPFA, she worked in management, in news, and in radio documentary production. A documentary series she co-produced (with Adi Gevins) won the 1977 Peabody Award in broadcasting. Other KPFA production efforts by Garrett, won the Edwin Howard Armstrong award.

In 1996, Garrett was awarded the Pulitzer Prize for Explanatory Journalism for a series of works published in Newsday that chronicled the Ebola virus outbreak in Zaire. In 1997, she won a George Polk Award for foreign reporting, for "Crumbled Empire, Shattered Health" in Newsday, described as "a series of 25 articles on the public health crisis in the former Soviet Union". She won another Polk award in 2000 for her book Betrayal of Trust, "a meticulously researched account of health catastrophes occurring in different places simultaneously and amounting to a disaster of global proportions".

In 2004, Garrett joined the Council on Foreign Relations as the senior fellow of the Global Health Program. She has worked on a broad variety of public health issues including SARS, avian flu, tuberculosis, malaria, shipping container clinics, the intersection of HIV and AIDS, and national security.

On June 27, 2021, an interview with Garrett comprised an entire episode of TWiV, This Week in Virology, in which she discussed many facets of the SARS-CoV-2, (also known as Covid-19) pandemic, comparisons with earlier epidemics, as well as, prospects for the future of public health.

== Personal ==
Garrett lives in the Brooklyn Heights neighborhood of New York City. She related during the June 2021 TWiV interview that she had been motivated to change to studying science in college by a promise made to her mother, who was dying of cancer.

== Selected works ==
- Laurie Garrett (1994), The Coming Plague: Newly Emerging Diseases in a World Out of Balance, Farrar, Straus and Giroux, OL 3373979W, Wikidata Q116771973.
- Garrett, Laurie (2000). Betrayal of Trust: The Collapse of Global Public Health. Hachette Books. ISBN 9780786884407.
- Garrett, Laurie (January–February 2005). "The Nightmare of Bioterrorism". Foreign Affairs. 80 (January/February 2001).
- Garrett, Laurie (July–August 2005). "The Next Pandemic?". Foreign Affairs. 84 (4): 3–23. doi:10.2307/20034417. JSTOR 20034417.
- Garrett, Laurie (2012). I Heard the Sirens Scream: How Americans Responded to the 9/11 and Anthrax Attacks. CreateSpace Independent Publishing Platform. ISBN 9781469910109.
- Garrett, Laurie (September–October 2015). "Ebola's Lessons How the WHO Mishandled the Crisis". Foreign Affairs. 94 (September/October 2015).
- Garrett, Laurie (January 31, 2020). "Trump Has Sabotaged America's Coronavirus Response". Foreign Policy.

== See also ==
- New Yorkers in journalism
