= The History of White People in America =

- Written by: Martin Mull; Allen Rucker
- Directed by: Harry Shearer
- Starring: Martin Mull; Fred Willard; Mary Kay Place; Edie McClurg; Christian Jacobs; Amy Lynne; Eileen Brennan; Steve Martin; Jack Riley; Harry Shearer; Michael McKean; Stella Stevens; Jeannetta Arnette
- Country of origin: United States
- Original language: English

Production
- Producers: Allen Rucker; Martin Mull; Kevin Bright

Original release
- Network: Cinemax
- Release: 1985

The History of White People in America was a series of 30-minute mockumentary-style vignettes, first broadcast on American television Cinemax beginning in 1985, and later re-edited for home video release.

== Broadcast ==
Martin Mull Presents The History Of White People In America, Part 1: In Search Of was broadcast June 4, 1985, hosted by Martin Mull, and starring Fred Willard, Mary Kay Place, Amy Lynne, Christian Jacobs, and Edie McClurg. It was written and produced by Martin Mull and Allen Rucker, and directed by Harry Shearer. Mull's wife Wendy Haas contributed the music.

The History of White People in America was done in the style of documentaries about minorities in the United States. The focus is a family of empty-headed white people clueless about the complexities of the world around them. Each 30-minute segment focuses on a particular theme (e.g. religion, crime). Martin Mull plays a reporter after the fashion of 60 Minutes investigative TV journalism, interviewing participants as well as providing narration or commentary directly into the camera.

== Volume I (1985) ==
The series begins with introductory "testimonials" by Steve Martin, Teri Garr, and Bob Eubanks, who explain what being white means to them. Martin admits he's a white person, but apologizes for not being a very good one. Garr claims to be one of the few white people who can dance. Eubanks says he's only recently come to terms with being white, and if going public can help others to cope with their whiteness, he'll consider his public declaration to have been for the best.

Mull as the narrator then discusses how recent films and television shows have celebrated ethnic diversity, but none have covered white people. He cites the miniseries Roots as an example, but focuses on Ben Vereen's portrayal of Chicken George as the supposed highlight. He also includes the miniseries Shōgun, sarcastically describing it as the history of Japan told by Richard Chamberlain.

=== Part one: "In Search Of" ===
Mull introduces the viewers to the average white family in America, the Harrisons of Hawkins Falls, Ohio. Highlights include the Harrisons hosting a backyard barbecue and interacting with their neighbors, all of whom are equally average, white, and fond of mayonnaise.

=== Part two: "A Closer Look" ===
The Harrisons are shown reacting to appearing on television in Part One, with Mull explaining how "getting in touch" with their whiteness has changed them. Daughter Debbie uses her increased confidence to win election as president of her high school's student council, where she arbitrarily enacts edicts including mandatory deodorant dispensers for the student bathrooms, "especially the boys." Wife and mother Joyce Harrison begins a support network for other women in the neighborhood to explore what being white means to them, beginning with the members of her Amway group.

The Harrisons are later shown individually discussing sex on the phone with friends, with Debbie shocked after a friend tells her the real thing is better than what was depicted in Porky's and Joyce expressing dismay at a friend who says her husband and she prefer to leave the bedroom lights on when they're intimate. Tommy attempts to learn breakdancing, which causes his parents to bring him to the Institute for White Studies in Zanesville for retraining.

Husband and father Hal attempts to learn about other cultures by inviting a rabbi (played by Harry Shearer) to his home, but the discussion doesn't go well, as Hal commits several faux pas, including offering the rabbi ham and asking when Jews put propellers on their yarmulkes. Joyce attempts to visit a sick neighbor, but discovers the neighbor isn't sick, but Sikh.

The segment closes with the Harrisons taking part in a local civic club's "White Pride Night," including a costumed song and dance routine that celebrates white peoples' contributions to American history.

== Volume II (1986) ==
Martin Mull continues his in-depth (mock) examination of cultural dynamics, originally broadcast on Cinemax as four individual segments in fall 1986:

- "White Religion"
- "White Politics" (October 24, 1986)
- "White Crime"
- "White Stress" (November 8, 1986)

== Portrait of a White Marriage ==
The third installment of the series, broadcast in 1988, drops the "documentary" approach while still featuring Mull and company in Hawkins Falls, Ohio.

== Home video ==
All three installments were released on VHS by MCA Home Video.

== Books ==
- Mull, Martin; Rucker, Allen (October 9, 1985). The History of White People in America. Perigee Books. p. 143. ISBN 9780399511936.
- Mull, Martin; Rucker, Allen (October 1, 1986). A Paler Shade of White: The History of White People in America: Volume II. Perigee Books. p. 158. ISBN 9780399513008.

== Reception ==
1985 CableACE Award for Comedy Special was given to Martin Mull (executive producer), Allen Rucker (producer), Kevin Bright (producer), and Cinemax, for The History of White People in America.

== Adaptations ==
In 2007, The History of White People in America was adapted for the stage by Lincoln High School, Lincoln, Illinois for the Drama & Group Interpretation State Final Competition of the Illinois High School Association.

== See also ==
- An American Family - a 1971 documentary TV series parodied in The History of White People in America.
- Fernwood 2 Night - a 1977 mock talk show series starring Martin Mull and Fred Willard employing similar social satire.
- BabaKiueria - a 1986 Australian mockumentary about an oppressed white minority in a society dominated by Aboriginal Australians.
- White - a serious 2008 BBC2 documentary series about the white working class in Britain.
- White People - a serious 2015 documentary that explores white culture and privilege in America.
