= Adi Gevins =

Adi Gevins is a San Francisco Bay Area–based radio documentarian, producer, educator, archivist, and creative consultant. Gevins has been referred to as the "fairy godmother of community radio".

== Radio career ==
Gevins has won an Ohio State Award, an American Bar Association Silver Gavel, multiple Golden Reels from the National Federation of Community Broadcasters, and two George Foster Peabody Awards, one with Laurie Garrett for Science Story in 1978, and one with SoundVision for The DNA Files in 2000.

Much of Gevins' work has been done for the Pacifica Radio station KPFA in Berkeley, California, including One Billion Seconds Later, which won the Ohio State Award and Me and My Shadow, a documentary about the FBI's COINTELPRO infiltration of the New Left. Gevins later served as executive producer for the celebrated public radio documentary series, The Bill of Rights Radio Education Project, produced for KPFA and Pacifica Radio.

Gevins holds a master's degree in library and information studies from the University of California at Berkeley.

In 2021, Gevins received the Society of Professional Journalists' Norcal 2020 Excellence in Journalism Unsung Hero Award for her work as protector of the KPFA archives; as well as, her broader archival efforts assists organizations around the country in archiving their own broadcasts.

== Personal life ==
Gevins was married to communications lawyer and community radio and television advocate Michael Couzens.
