= Language Says It All =

1987 film

- Directed by: Rhyena Halpern
- Produced by: Megan Williams
- Production company: Tripod
- Distributed by: Filmakers Library
- Release date: 1987
- Country: United States
- Language: English

Language Says It All is a 1987 American short documentary film about deaf children and their caregivers, directed by Rhyena Halpern and produced by Halpern and Megan Williams.

== Accolades ==
The film was nominated for an Academy Award for Best Documentary Short.

== See also ==
- List of films featuring the deaf and hard of hearing
