= Tom Weinberg =

American film producer

- Education: New York University
- Occupations: Filmmaker; Documentary producer Television producer

Tom Weinberg is a Chicago native filmmaker, independent documentary producer, and television producer. From an early age, he held an interest in television and media. He founded the independent video archive Media Burn in 2003, and currently sits on the board of directors as president. As a producer, he focused on guerrilla television and revolutionizing ways in which the public could have access to news other than what was displayed within the mainstream media. Some of his notable works include The 90s, the Emmy Award-winning Image Union, and the TVTV video collective.

A major advocate for independent film producers, Weinberg formed the Media Burn Independent Archive as a way to archive and digitize independent film and documentaries. This archive has received recognition by the National Archives as well as Save America's Treasures due to its distinctive collection of private works that are essential to the history of the relationship between Chicago's film, media, and politics.

His presence was and still remains an influential role in Chicago's media and television.

== Early life ==
In 1947, the Weinberg family purchased their first television set, which was the beginning of Tom Weinberg's fascination with television media. He earned his MBA from New York University in 1968, then continued to work for his father's business at the Py-O-My Baking Mix Company. After his father died and the business was sold, Weinberg pursued a career in television.

Weinberg was first employed at the Channel 26 television station in Chicago as a stock market reporter. Eventually, as a producer, he created the show "A Black's View of the News," which was a news show featuring black anchors addressing topics regarding black culture and events, aimed at a black audience. At Channel 26, he did extensive news coverage on cases such as the Chicago Seven trial.

== Career ==
=== TVTV ===
Weinberg co-founded the TVTV video collective in 1972 along with Allen Rucker, Michael Shamberg, Hudson Marquez, and Megan Williams. Its purpose was to provide the public with important news coverage that was not broadcast on mainstream media. The World's Largest TV Show and Four More Years were two documentaries produced by this collective.

=== It's a Living ===
In 1975, Weinberg was part of producing Chicago's first independent series on television, It's a Living, which was also featured on Chicago's WTTW channel. The show was meant to capture the everyday lives of working-class people and for those individuals to give their own stories. The idea of this show was based on Studs Terkel's book Working. It's a Living was aired from 1975 to 1976, which included a one-hour episode and six half-hours. Weinberg also collaborated with other Chicago video pioneers Anda Korsts and Jim Wiseman on this groundbreaking project.

=== Image Union ===
After a meeting with the Corporation for Public Broadcasting in 1976, Weinberg produced the television series Image Union, which showcased the raw works of independent filmmakers. With the advances made in guerrilla television, this show served as a way for the public to access the footage of independent filmmakers in the Chicago area. In 1978, the show was first aired by the WTTW station (PBS in Chicago) on Saturday night. By the 80s, as many as 150,000 people tuned in for the hour-long episodes. Due to its popularity, Image Union expanded to other cities across the country and later received four Emmy awards. Although Image Union still airs on television, Weinberg later left the show to pursue other projects. The first decade's worth of episodes can be found at the Media Burn Archive.

=== The 90s ===
Weinberg, along with fellow producer Joel Cohen, created the television series The 90s as a way to change broadcasting and the way that the general public could access mainstream media and news coverage. Documentary footage was often used, and the show included politics, talk segments, and interviews. Because of the advances in portable camera technology, The 90s and other forms of "alternative television" were able to be created. The show generated an audience of 25 million while PBS aired it on 25 stations.

=== Media Burn ===
In 2003, Tom Weinberg founded the Media Burn Independent Video Archive in Chicago, Illinois. Before this, there was not an archive for any of the surviving works done by Chicago and global independent documentary filmmakers, especially those filmed during the guerrilla television era that had stemmed from the civil unrest of the 1960s. Media Burn has received notability and recognition from the National Archives and Save America's Treasures. This archive holds more than 8000 videos, and in recent years, upwards of 18 million views on the internet at mediaburn.org, YouTube and social media.
