= 1972 Republican National Convention =

Political convention of the Republican Party

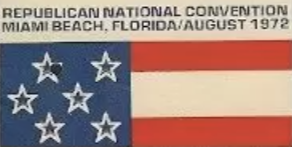
- 1972 presidential election

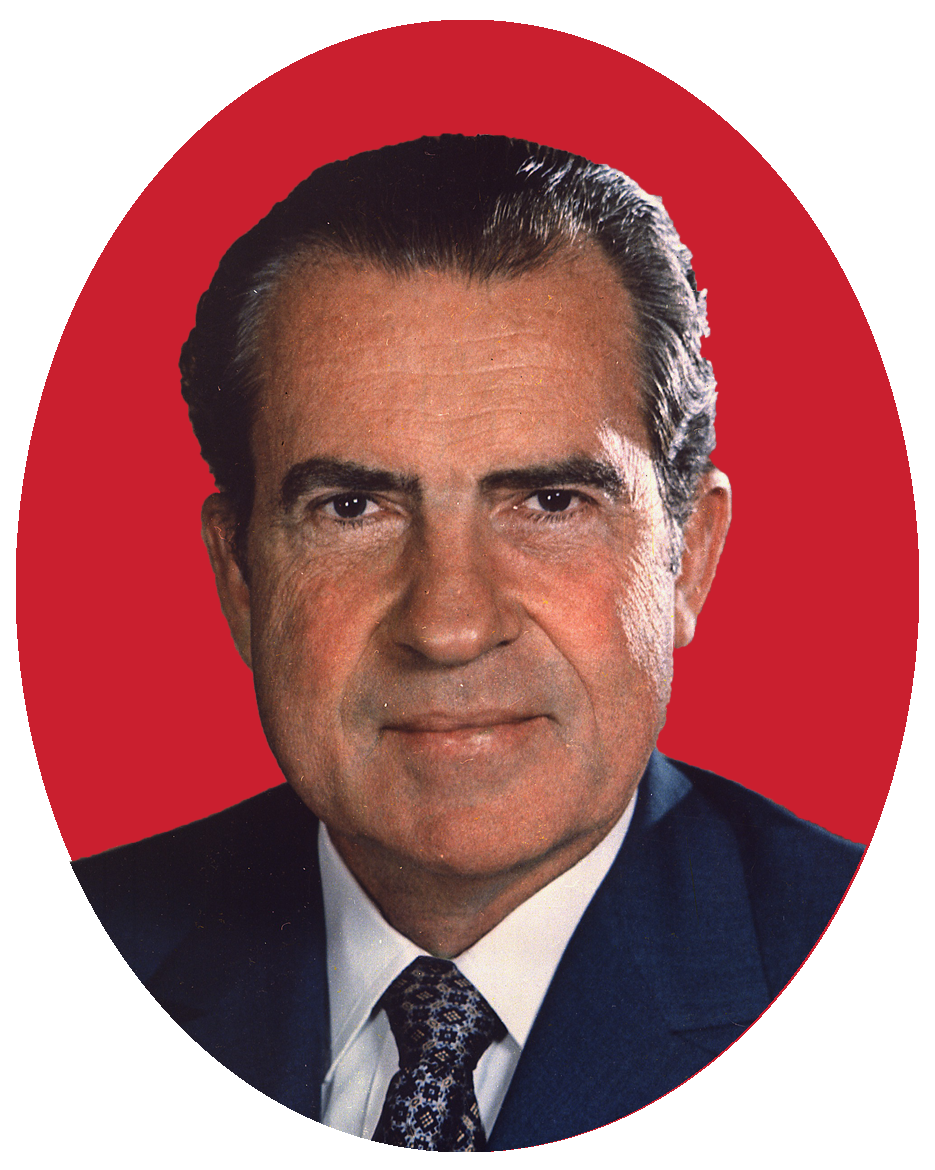
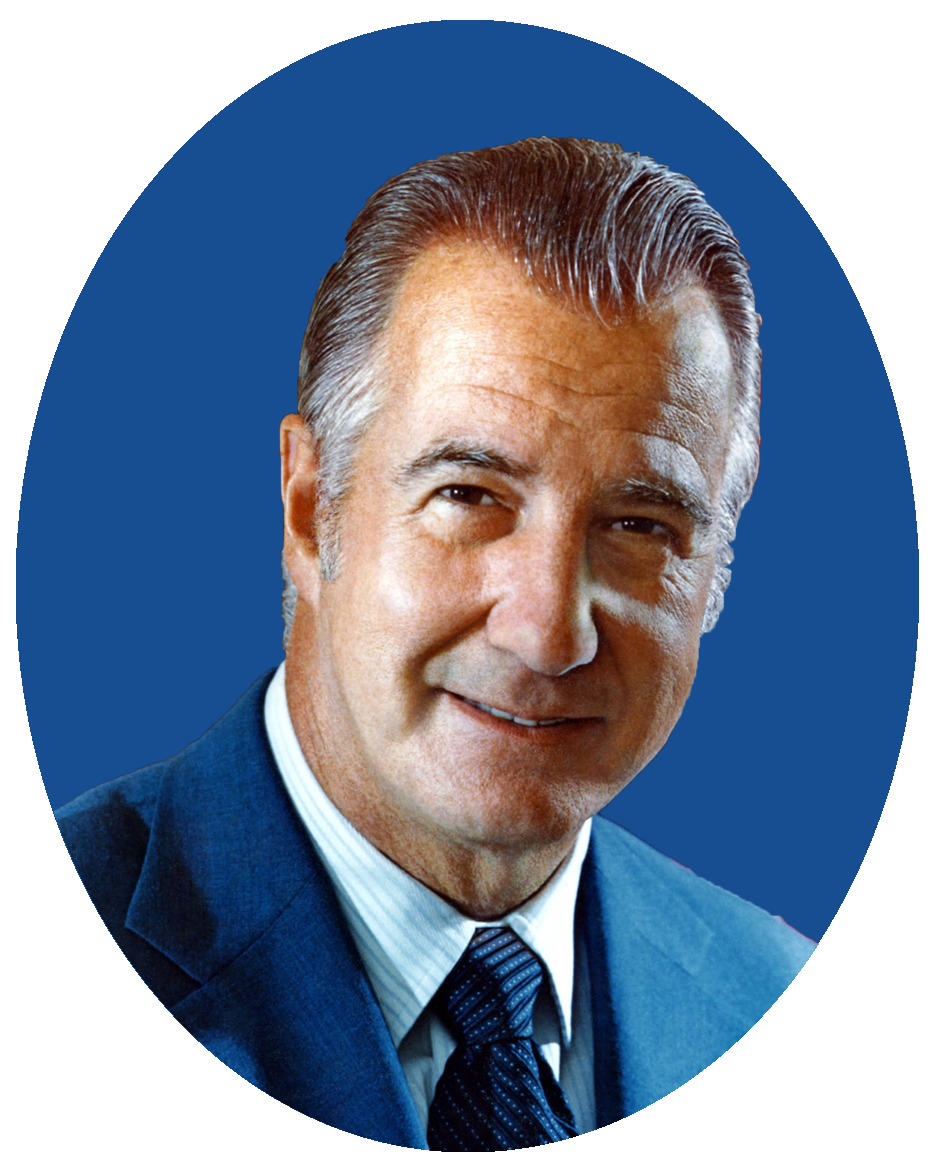
- Nominees; Nixon and Agnew

Convention
- Dates: August 21–23, 1972
- City: Miami Beach, Florida
- Venue: Miami Beach Convention Center
- Keynote speaker: Anne Armstrong

Candidates
- Presidential nominee: Richard M. Nixon of California
- Vice-presidential nominee: Spiro T. Agnew of Maryland

The 1972 Republican National Convention was held from August 21 to August 23, 1972, at the Miami Beach Convention Center in Miami Beach, Florida. It nominated President Richard Nixon and Vice President Spiro Agnew for reelection. The convention was chaired by House minority leader and future Nixon successor Gerald Ford of Michigan. It was the fifth time that Nixon had been nominated on the Republican ticket for vice president (1952 and 1956) or president (1960 and 1968). Nixon's five appearances on his party's ticket matched the major-party American standard of Franklin D. Roosevelt, a Democrat who had been nominated for vice president once (1920) and president four times (1932, 1936, 1940, and 1944). Nixon was the first Republican to be nominated three times for president.

The convention was the first Republican convention scheduled for only three days since 1944, joining the 2012 Democratic National Convention as the only conventions in modern convention history to be scheduled for three days.

== Site selection ==
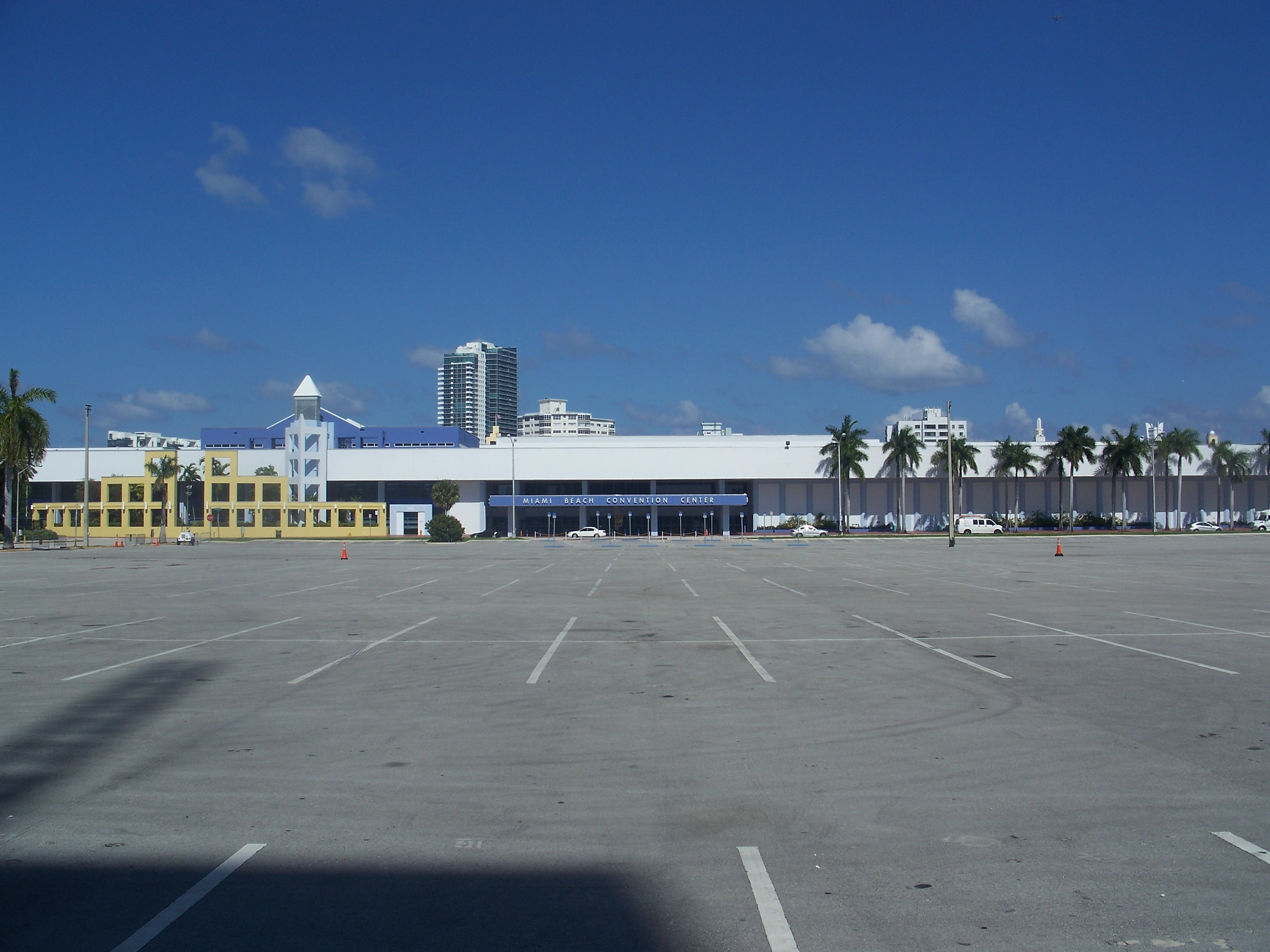
The Miami Beach Convention Center was the site of the 1972 Republican National Convention.

San Diego, California, had originally been selected as host city for the convention on July 23, 1971, with the event expected to take place at the San Diego Sports Arena. Columnist Jack Anderson discovered a memo written by Dita Beard, a lobbyist for the International Telephone and Telegraph Corp., suggesting that the company could pledge $400,000 for the San Diego bid if the Department of Justice would settle its antitrust case against ITT. Fearing scandal, and citing labor and cost concerns, the GOP transferred the event—scarcely three months before it was to begin—to Miami Beach, Florida, also the host city of the Democratic National Convention. It was the sixth and last time that both national party conventions were held in the same city; Chicago had hosted double conventions in 1884, 1932, 1944 and 1952, and Philadelphia in 1948. The Republican convention did not come to San Diego until 1996.

== Speeches ==
The convention set a new standard, as it was scripted as a media event to an unprecedented degree.

The keynote address by Anne Armstrong of Texas was the first major party national convention keynote delivered by a woman.

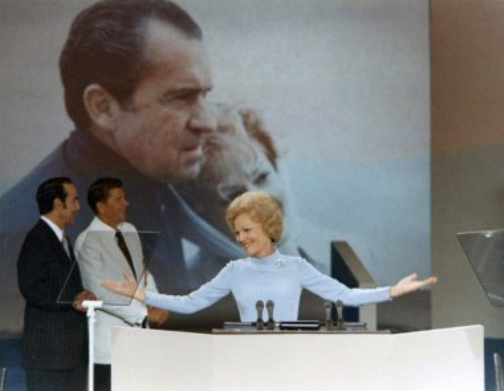
First Lady Pat Nixon addresses the convention. She was the first First Lady since Eleanor Roosevelt to address a party convention, and the first Republican First Lady to do what is now considered common practice.

First Lady Pat Nixon became the first Republican First Lady, and the first First Lady in over 25 years, to address a party's national convention. Her speech set the standard for future convention speeches by political spouses. Republican First Ladies Nancy Reagan, Barbara Bush, Laura Bush and Melania Trump, among others, have all followed in this tradition. Democratic First Ladies Hillary Clinton, Michelle Obama, and Jill Biden have also followed in this tradition.

== Balloting ==
Nixon easily turned back primary challenges from the right, in the person of Representative John M. Ashbrook of Ohio and, from the left, Representative Pete McCloskey of California. However, under New Mexico state law, McCloskey had earned one delegate, which the convention refused to seat, fearing that the delegate might put McCloskey's name in nomination and deliver an anti-war speech. Congressman (and delegate) Manuel Lujan of New Mexico, a staunch Nixon supporter, honored state law by voting for McCloskey himself. The final result was that Nixon received 1,347 votes to one for McCloskey and none for Ashbrook. Throughout the precisely scripted convention, delegates chanted "Four more years! Four more years!"

Spiro Agnew was renominated for vice president with 1,345 votes against one vote for NBC television journalist David Brinkley and two abstentions.

== Protest activity ==
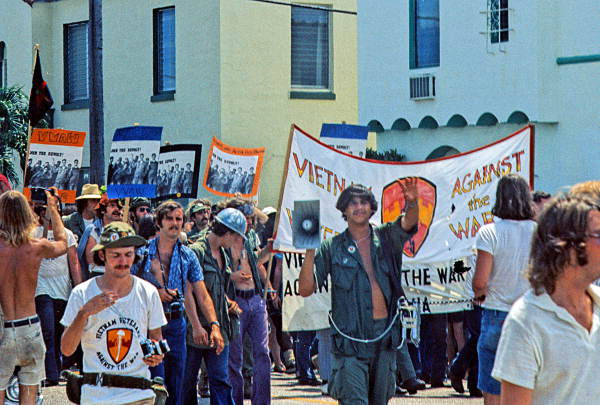
Protestors at the convention

The convention was targeted for widespread protests, particularly against the Vietnam War, and the Nixon administration made efforts to suppress it. This tension was captured by Top Value Television in the independent documentary Four More Years, which juxtaposes shots of the protests outside the convention with the internal politics of the convention. A day after the convention, The New York Times reported that 900 demonstrators had been arrested, and the police reported that 52 people, including 12 policemen, had been injured.

In 2005, files released under a Freedom of Information Act lawsuit revealed that the Federal Bureau of Investigation monitored former Beatle John Lennon after he was invited to play for Yippie protests. The surveillance of Lennon later concluded that he was not a dangerous revolutionary, as he was "constantly under the influence of narcotics." The Justice Department indicted Scott Camil, John Kniffen, Alton Foss, Donald Perdue, William Patterson, Stan Michelsen, Peter Mahoney and John Briggs—collectively known as the Gainesville Eight—on charges of conspiracy to disrupt the convention, but all were exonerated.

Oliver Stone's film Born on the Fourth of July, based on Ron Kovic's autobiography of the same name, depicts Kovic and fellow Vietnam Veterans Against the War activists Bobby Muller, Bill Wieman and Mark Clevinger being spat upon at the convention. The scene did not appear in Kovic's autobiography but was taken almost directly from a documentary film created about the 1972 Republican Convention titled Operation Last Patrol by filmmaker and actor Frank Cavestani and photo journalist Catherine Leroy.

== See also ==
- History of the United States Republican Party
- List of Republican National Conventions
- U.S. presidential nomination convention
- 1972 Democratic National Convention
- 1972 United States presidential election
- Richard Nixon 1972 presidential campaign

Preceded by 1968; Miami Beach, Florida	Republican National Conventions	Succeeded by 1976; Kansas City, Missouri
