= Here Come the Videofreex =

Here Come the Videofreex is a 2015 documentary film which explores the history of the Videofreex video collective.
