= Skip Blumberg =

American filmmaker

- Born: October 10, 1947 (age 78); New York City
- Known for: Video art, new media art
- Spouse: Jane Aaron (m. 1988; died 2015)

Skip Blumberg (born October 10, 1947) is an American filmmaker. He is one of the original camcorder-for-broadcast TV producers, and among the first wave of video artists in the 1970s. His early work reflects the era's emphasis on guerrilla tactics and medium-specific graphics, but his more recent work takes on more global issues. His work has screened widely on television and at museums. His video Pick Up Your Feet: The Double Dutch Show (1981) is considered a classic documentary video and was included in the Museum of Television and Radio's exhibition TV Critics' all-time favorite shows. His cultural documentaries and performance videos have been broadcast on PBS, National Geographic TV, Showtime, Bravo, Nickelodeon, among others.

== Influence ==
Blumberg recognized early in the 70s the potential of film recording could have in society. Just like him, many new hip youngsters are part of this new revolution of sharing media content with the tip of their fingers. Filmmaking makes it possible for media spaces and experiments with their footage to share their perceptions of their world. As Bloomberg puts it to be communicators and activists, sharing messages through video format allows for experimentation in ways that will make audiences react to the video. Teaching filmmakers how to reflect cultural standards and sort of instill rebellion through videography allowed a community of citizens to question culture and norms. Melanie La Rosa interviews Blumberg on this topic of modern media stating, "the current media landscape now also includes many websites with archives." questioning how media fits into the university model. His take on the early video movement contributes to the modern digital age of rapid, and complex forms of communication through media creating new internet social networks. A key takeaway from Blumberg that everyone should know, is one thing the early video movement has contributed to modern-day media, is the initiation for creativity and how digital utopia can be reshaped to question and to inspire.

Reference:La Rosa, Melanie. “Early Video Pioneer: An Interview with Skip Blumberg.” Journal of Film and Video 64, no. 1–2 (2012): 30–41. https://doi.org/10.5406/jfilmvideo.64.1-2.0030.

For TVTV, Blumberg worked with behind-the-scenes coverage of broadcast news interviewing Walter Cronkite, John Chancellor, and they introduced the popularization of anchors in the news.

He was a part of the early video collective Videofreex.

He is currently producing works for The My Hero Project and Sesame Street along with various independent productions.

== Works ==
- When I was a Worker Like Lavern, 1976 - An early example of Blumberg's personal documentary approach begins as an informative look at the mail-order distribution process, and ends as a candid observation of management/labor relations.
- For a Moment You Fly, 1978 - A portrait of a unique one ring circus in NYC. This is an informal portrait of a circus that emphasizes "human-sized events" as an alternative to the mainstream circus, suggesting an affinity with Blumberg's own "human-sized" video as an alternative to mainstream television.
- Contests USA, 1980 - A three-part documentary; Summer Ski Jumping, The Ugly Dog Contest, Festival of (Musical) Saws, that explore the "extraordinary" aspects of "ordinary" people.
- Pick Up Your Feet: The Double Dutch Show, 1981 - A look at the young participants of the Double Dutch Championship in New York City.
- Sesame Street - Since 1988, Skip Blumburg has created over 75 segments for the show.
- Nick At Nite ID's, 1991 - Skip Blumburg created 4 ID's for the block using pixelation & rotoscoping.
- Cookie Girl in the Hot Zone, 2001 - A short produced for myhero.com about 12-year-old Jemma Brown, who started to serve cookies to the firefighters 3 days after the September 11, 2001 attacks on the World Trade Center.
- Con Creep, 2001 - A portrait of a New York street musician who has maintained financial stability despite the constant presence of the police force.

== Awards and honors ==
- Ohio State University Journalism Award
- Guggenheim Fellowship
- Participating Filmmaker - Sundance Institute Dance Video Lab
- Esquire Magazine's “Best of the Next Generation”
- Museum of TV and Radio's “TV Critics’ Favorite Shows of All-Time.”

== See also ==
- List of video artists
- Ant Farm
- TVTV
- Chip Lord
