= Videofreex =

American video collective, 1969–1978

- Members of Videofreex in the early 1970s
- Formation: 1969
- Founder: David Cort, Parry Teasdale, Mary Curtis Ratcliff
- Type: Artist collective
- Purpose: Experimental video art and grassroots media
- Headquarters: New York, United States
- Region served: United States
- Key people: Skip Blumberg, Bart Friedman, Nancy Cain
- Website: videofreex.org

The Videofreex were a pioneering video collective who used the Sony Portapak for countercultural video projects from 1969 to 1978. They were founded in 1969 by David Cort, Mary Curtis Ratcliff and Parry Teasdale, after Cort and Teasdale met each other at the Woodstock Music Festival. Other early members include Skip Blumberg, Chuck Kennedy, Davidson Gigliotti, Bart Friedman, Carol Vontobel, Nancy Cain, and Ann Woodward, with dozens of additional collaborators participating in the group's cooperative projects.

== History ==
The group formed initially when CBS executive Don West hired young videographers to create a documentary program about the counterculture. With network funding, the group traveled the country recording interviews with activists and revolutionaries, including Abbie Hoffman and Fred Hampton. The finished program was never broadcast, but the equipment acquired for the production would form the basis for future projects.

Initially based out of New York City, in 1971 the Videofreex moved to a 27-bedroom house in the Catskill Mountains named the Maple Tree Farm, one of the first independent media centers in the United States. In early 1972, they launched the first pirate television station, Lanesville TV, using a transmitter given to them by Abbie Hoffman. The group would refer to Lanesville TV as "probably America's smallest TV station." From 1972-1978, the station featured stories about the small community in which the station was broadcasting, aiming to create a participatory form of media that included collaborations with and contributions from community members and invited live phone calls from viewers responding to their broadcasts.

In order to receive an initial grant of $40,000 from The New York State Council of the Arts, the Videofreex rebranded itself as the non-profit "Media Bus".

Michael Shamberg, author of Guerrilla Television and founding member of TVTV, remarked, "The Freex are the most production oriented of the video groups […] in terms of finished, cleanly edited, high quality tape, which is generally quite entertaining, the Videofreex are clearly the best."

== Legacy ==
In an interview, Skip Blumberg revealed a piece of the collective's mindset when it came to showcasing their work. He stated, "Despite being card-carrying avant-garde, the Videofreex always had a fairly show-business approach to screening our work." This approach was particularly evident in their Prince Street studio in NYC, where they hosted weekly screenings that encompassed a diverse array of content, including music, politics, culture, and dance. Curating dynamic and spontaneous mixes of these tapes, and employing different playback machines to VJ for audiences ranging from a few individuals to crowds of up to 150 people. The screenings, although unadvertised, drew audiences through the allure of free press coverage in esteemed publications such as Rolling Stone, the Village Voice, and even the New Yorker's "Talk of the Town" section.^{[8]}

The Videofreex Archive, containing more than 1,500 original tapes, is housed at the Video Data Bank. Work is underway to preserve important titles from the Archive and make them available through distribution.

The 2015 documentary Here Come the Videofreex, directed by Jon Nealon and Jenny Raskin, chronicles the group's history.

== Members ==
- Skip Blumberg
- Mary Curtis Ratcliff
- Parry Teasdale
