= TVTV (video collective) =

American guerilla video collective

- Location: San Francisco, Los Angeles

Membership
- Notable members: Michael Shamberg, Chip Lord, Skip Blumberg

Art
- Movement: Video art, guerilla art, video activism
- Notable works: Four More Years, Lord of the Universe, The World's Largest TV Studio

Other
- Associated groups: Videofreex, Ant Farm

TVTV (short for Top Value Television) was a San Francisco-based video collective that produced documentary video works using guerrilla art techniques.

== History ==
The group was founded in 1972 by Allen Rucker, Michael Shamberg, Tom Weinberg, Hudson Marquez, and Megan Williams. Shamberg was the author of the 1971 "do-it-yourself" video production manual Guerrilla Television

TVTV pioneered the use of independent video based on the new and then-revolutionary media, ½" Sony Portapak video equipment, later embracing the ¾" video format.

In 1975 the group left San Francisco for Los Angeles, where it took up a contract with PBS to shoot Supervisions, a series of short tapes on television history.

The group disbanded in 1979. Their last production was TVTV: Diary of the Video Guerillas.

== Members ==
Over the years, more than thirty "guerrilla video" makers were participants in TVTV productions. They included members of the Ant Farm (Chip Lord, Doug Michels, Hudson Marquez, and Curtis Schreier) and the Videofreex (Skip Blumberg, Nancy Cain, Chuck Kennedy, and Parry Teasdale). Other participants in TVTV included designer Elan Soltes, producer David Axelrod, actor-comedian Bill Murray and his brother Brian Doyle-Murray, cinematographer Paul Goldsmith, actor and director Harold Ramis, producer Wendy Appel (aka Wendy Apple), and lawyer Michael Couzens.

In 1976-1977, experimental filmmaker Wheeler Winston Dixon briefly joined the collective, editing most of the Supervision series, as well as portions of the Hard Rain Special and the entirety of The TVTV Show.

== Legacy ==
The move to Los Angeles brought many in the group more into the orbit of conventional filmmaking. Bill Murray went on to become a film and TV star; Michael Shamberg a film producer, most notably with his company Jersey Films, in collaboration with Stacey Sher and Danny DeVito; Allen Rucker a writer and author; Wheeler Winston Dixon an author and university professor; Harold Ramis a film director, writer and actor; Skip Blumberg a videographer and producer; Tom Weinberg a producer based in his hometown, Chicago; and Elan Soltes a video graphic designer in Hollywood.

The Berkeley Art Museum and Pacific Film Archive has digitized hundreds of hours of raw footage shot for The World's Largest TV Studio, Four More Years, and Gerald Ford's America, along with extensive paper archives. Collections of TVTV productions and footage can also be found at Media Burn Independent Video Archive, Electronic Arts Intermix, Visual Studies Workshop and Experimental Television Center.

The 2018 film TVTV: Video Revolutionaries by director Paul Goldsmith explored the group's history.

== Productions ==
- The World's Largest TV Studio (1972), covering the 1972 Democratic National Convention
- Four More Years (1972), covering the 1972 Republican National Convention
- Lord of the Universe (1974), an award-winning documentary on the activities of the Guru Maharaj Ji and his followers
- Adland (1974), an examination of American commercial culture
- Gerald Ford's America (1975)
- The Good Times are Killing Me (1975) a portrait of Cajun culture. Focusing on the Cajuns' strong cultural identity as well as the life of Cajun Musician Nathan Abshire
- TVTV: Super Bowl (1976) concept by Rich Rosen
- TVTV Looks at the Oscars (1976) concept by Rich Rosen
- Supervision (1976), a multipart PBS series about the birth of television and its cultural impact
- The Bob Dylan Hard Rain Special (1976), another NBC co-production
- The TVTV Show (1976), TVTV's final television special, co-produced with NBC television, directed by Alan Myerson

== See also ==
- Saturday Night Live
- History of television
- New Journalism
