= Lanesville TV =

Pirate television station in Lanesville, New York

- Lanesville, New York; United States
- Channels: Analog: 3 (VHF)

Ownership
- Owner: Videofreex

History
- First air date: March 19, 1972
- Last air date: February 1977

Lanesville TV (channel 3) was a pirate television station in Lanesville, New York, United States, set up by the Videofreex collective. The station used a transmitter donated by Abbie Hoffman to broadcast its signals. Member Bart Friedman compared it to later public access television stations. The group referred to Lanesville TV as "probably America's smallest TV station".

At the time, Lanesville's population was too sparse to afford a cable television system. The station made its first broadcast on March 19, 1972, initially running half-hour weekly programs at 7 p.m. on Sundays, before moving to Saturdays later in the year, as a result of a viewer poll. In 1976 the station was featured in WNET's Video Television Review, outlining its operations. Its programming consisted of "narrowcasting" local events.

Broadcasts closed in February 1977, with five members of the collective continuing to work for Videofreex after its closure; the collective was disbanded the following year.
