= Michael Couzens =

American communications attorney

Michael Couzens (1946 - March 18, 2023) was a communications attorney and community broadcasting advocate. Employed by the FCC in the 1970s, Couzens headed the Low Power Television Task Force which developed the rules and regulations for Low Power Television.

== Education ==
Couzens studied Law at the University of California Berkeley and economics at Stanford University. While at law school at the University of California, Berkeley, Couzens participated in video production with the collectives Optic Nerve and TVTV furthering his interest in broadcasting. After graduating from UC Berkeley, Couzens was admitted to the bar in California and in Washington, D.C.

As a conscientious objector to the Vietnam War, Couzens did his service at the Brookings Institution in Washington, DC.

== Broadcasting ==
=== Legal career ===
After law school and serving at the Brookings Institution, Couzens worked for the Federal Communications Commission. Couzens was hired by the FCC as an attorney-advisor where he helped write the guidelines for Low Power Television. In 1976, he worked in Washington DC for a law firm representing the Corporation for Public Broadcasting (CPB), helping to develop the legal process for establishing TV dishes in major cities.

After working for the FCC, Couzens opened up his own law office, representing community radio and television stations to the Federal Communications Commission. Couzens practiced law for 30+ years, representing community stations throughout the United States, especially in rural areas. He worked with non-profit entities, advising them on FCC requirements while also assisting them with applications, licensing, and compliance issues. Couzens often worked Pro bono when his clients could not afford to pay him. Couzens was a board member and the Vice President for Legal Affairs for the National Translator Association, joining the organization at the birth of the LPTV initiative.

In 2007, in conjunction with the opening of a public filing window for frequencies for noncommercial full power station, Couzens teamed with Alan Korn to create Discount Legal. Over subsequent filing windows, Korn and Couzens assisted over 100 applicants to apply for new noncommercial educational FM stations of which 50 are currently on the air as of 2024.

=== Community radio ===
Couzens began his work in community radio in 1976 when, as he was coming out of law school, he volunteered to help represent the newly founded National Federation of Community Broadcasters (NFCB).

In 2020 Couzens stated his belief in community radio in an interview with The Union, a Grass Valley, Calif., newspaper: “If you read the blogs and trades, they say broadcast radio is stone cold dead, no radio audience whatsoever, but everything I see shows community radio is loved and essential, that people want it and will go find it. It’s that important, no matter what they say.” When asked about community radio's impact on the American landscape, Couzens responded, “It’s had people recognize, once again, that media and journalism work their best at the local level in a specific community. In that way it’s been very enriching.”

=== Reporting ===
Couzens wrote articles about broadcasting for a number of publications including Channels of Communication and the Encyclopedia of Television.

== Personal life ==
Working out of Oakland, California, Couzens frequented Bluegrass music concerts, practiced Karate as a Wado Kai black belt, and was married to radio producer and Peabody Award Winner Adi Gevins. Couzens was also a photographer, photographing many live events including the 1968 Democratic Convention.
