= 1972 Democratic National Convention =

U.S. political event held in Miami Beach, Florida

- 1972 presidential election

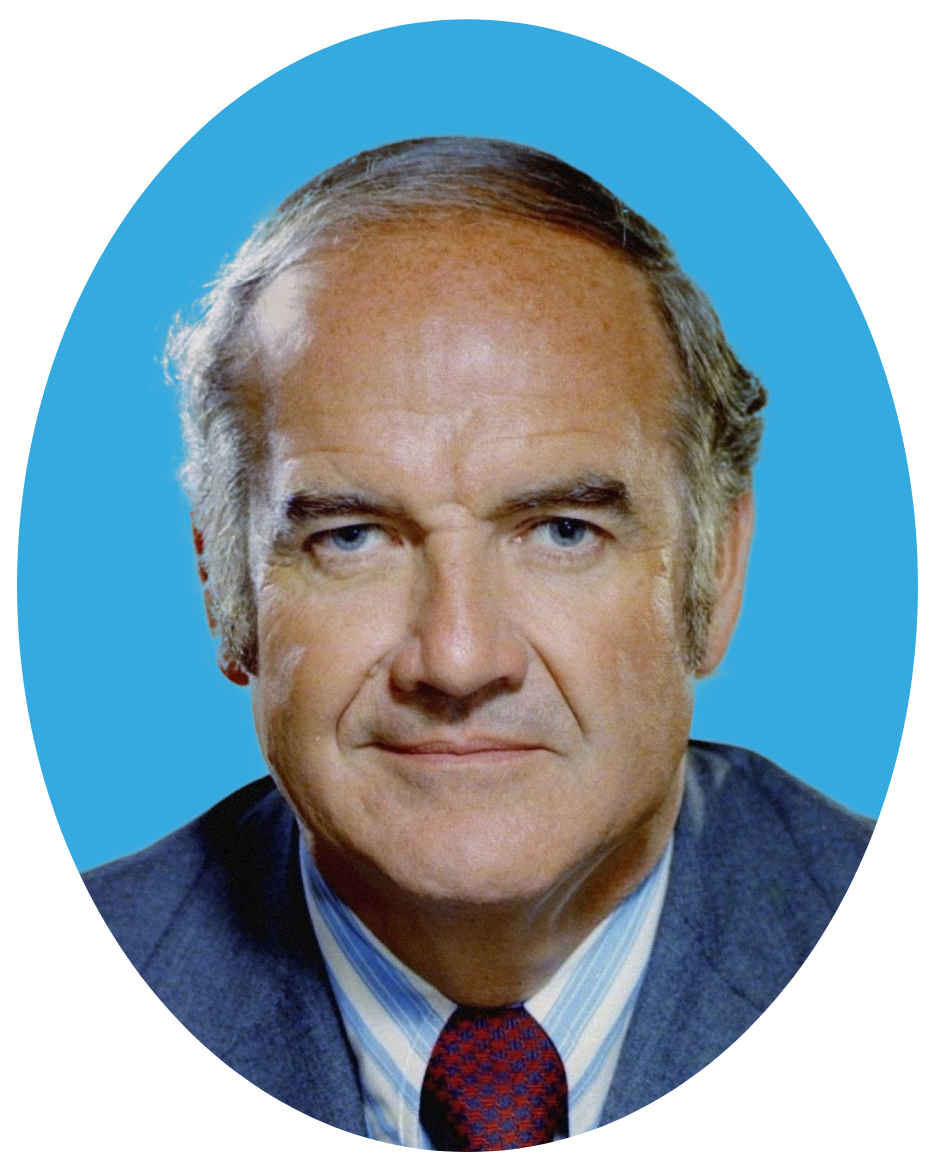
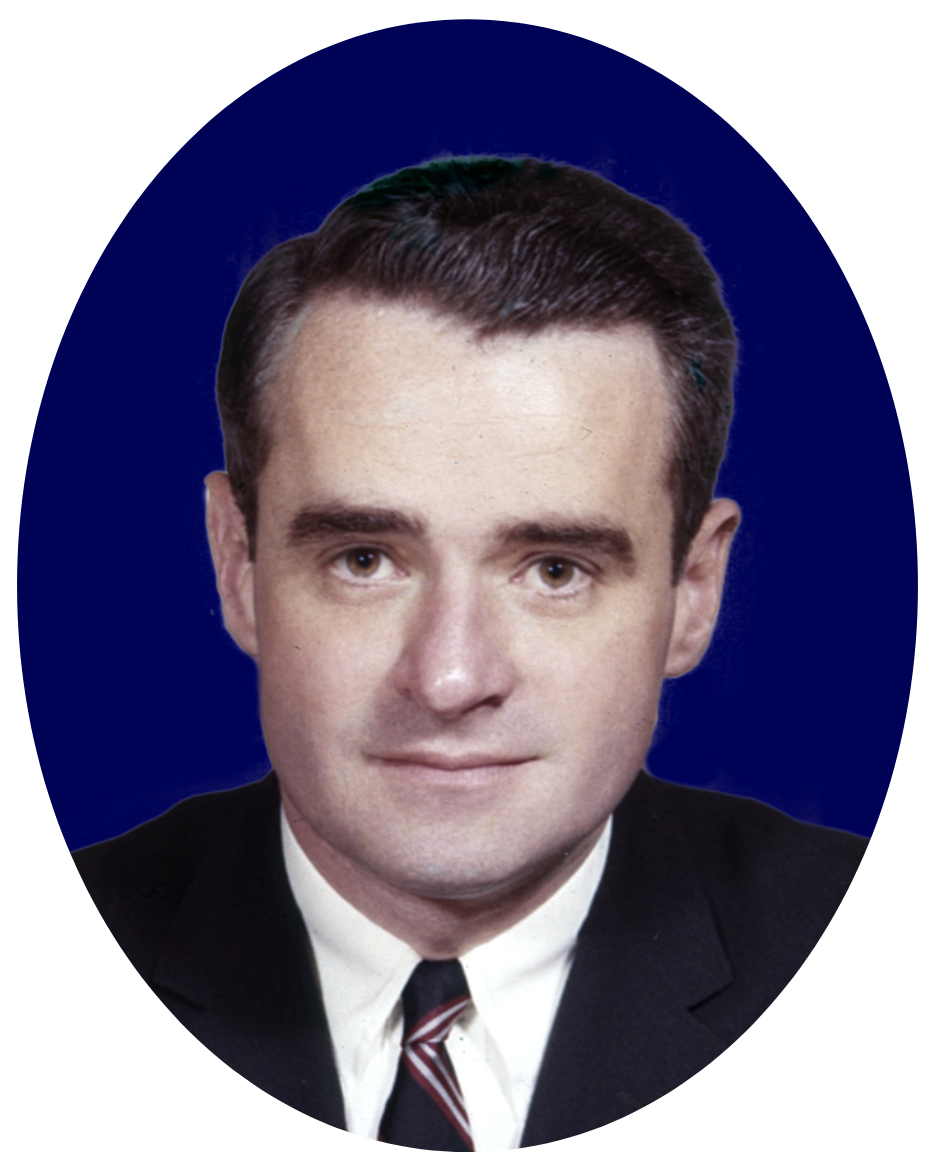
- Nominees; McGovern and Eagleton

Convention
- Dates: July 10–13, 1972
- City: Miami Beach, Florida
- Venue: Miami Beach Convention Center
- Keynote speaker: Reubin Askew

Candidates
- Presidential nominee: George McGovern of South Dakota
- Vice-presidential nominee: Thomas Eagleton of Missouri

The 1972 Democratic National Convention was the presidential nominating convention of the Democratic Party for the 1972 presidential election. It was held at Miami Beach Convention Center in Miami Beach, Florida, also the host city of the Republican National Convention that year, on July 10–13, 1972. Lawrence F. O'Brien served as permanent chairman of the convention, while Yvonne Braithwaite Burke served as vice-chair, becoming the first African American and the first woman of color to hold that position. On the last day of the convention, Lawrence F. O'Brien departed and Burke was left to preside for about fourteen hours.

The convention nominated Senator George McGovern of South Dakota for president and Senator Thomas Eagleton of Missouri for vice president. Eagleton withdrew from the race just 19 days later after it was disclosed that he had previously undergone mental health treatment, including electroshock therapy, and he was replaced on the ballot by Sargent Shriver of Maryland, a Kennedy in-law.

The convention, which has been described as "a disastrous start to the general election campaign", was one of the most unusual—perhaps the most contentious in the history of the Democratic Party since 1924—with sessions beginning in the early evening and lasting until sunrise the next morning. Previously excluded political activists gained influence at the expense of elected officials and traditional core Democratic constituencies such as organized labor. A protracted vice presidential nominating process delayed McGovern's acceptance speech (which he considered "the best speech of his life") until 2:48 a.m.—after most television viewers had gone to bed.

== Delegate selection ==
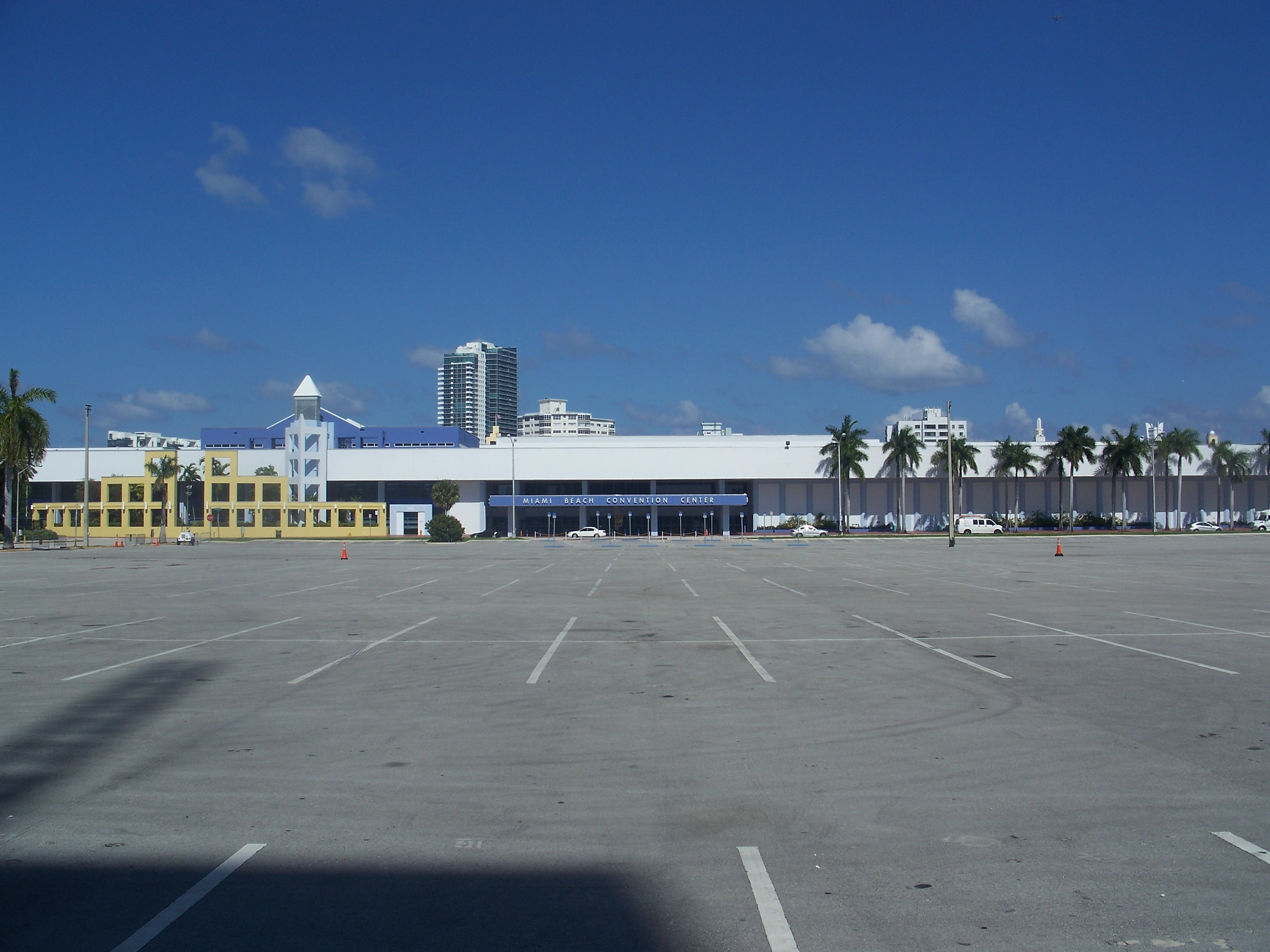
The Miami Beach Convention Center (shown here in 2011) was the site of the 1972 Democratic National Convention.

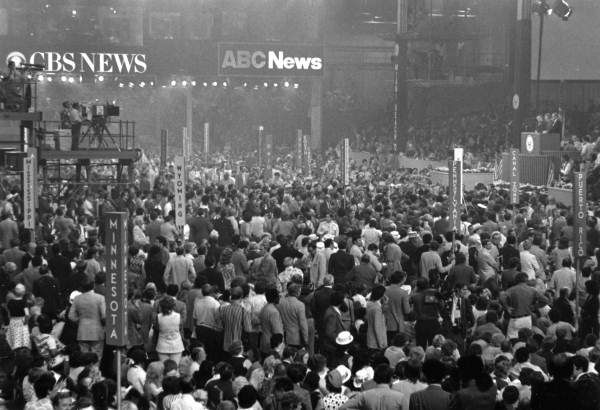
View of the convention in action

The 1972 convention was significant as the first implementation of the reforms set by the Commission on Party Structure and Delegate Selection, which McGovern himself had chaired before deciding to run for president. After McGovern resigned from his position as chair, he was replaced as chair by U.S. Representative Donald Fraser, which gave the McGovern–Fraser Commission its name. The 28-member commission was established after the tumultuous 1968 convention.

The commission set guidelines ordering state parties to "adopt explicit written Party rules governing delegate selection" and implemented eight "procedural rules and safeguards", including the prohibition of proxy voting, the end of the unit rule (winner-take-all primaries) and related practices such as instructing delegations, a new quorum requirement of not less than 40% at all party committee meetings, the removal of all mandatory assessments of delegates and the cap of mandatory participation fees at $10. In addition, there were new rules ensuring that party meetings in non-rural areas were held on uniform dates, at uniform times, and in places of easy access and that adequate public notice of all party meetings concerned with delegate selection was posted. Among the most significant of the changes were new quotas mandating that certain percentages of delegates be women or members of minority groups.

As a result of the new rules, subjects that were previously deemed not fit for political debate, such as abortion and gay rights, now occupied the forefront of political discussion. The new rules for choosing and seating delegates created an unusual number of rules and credentials challenges. Many traditional Democratic groups such as organized labor and big-city political machines had small representation at the convention. Their supporters challenged the seating of relative political novices, but for the most part were turned back by the supporters of McGovern, who during the presidential primaries had amassed the most delegates to the convention by using a grassroots campaign that was powered by opposition to the Vietnam War. Many traditional Democratic leaders and politicians felt that McGovern's delegate count did not reflect the wishes of most Democratic voters. Georgia Governor Jimmy Carter helped to spearhead a "Stop McGovern" campaign, while at the same time trying to become McGovern's candidate for vice president. The stop-McGovern forces tried unsuccessfully to alter the delegate composition of the California delegation.

The Illinois primary required voters to select individual delegates, not presidential candidates. Most Illinois delegation members were uncommitted and were controlled or influenced by Chicago Mayor Richard J. Daley, the leader of the Chicago political machine. The delegation was challenged by McGovern supporters arguing that the results of the primary did not create a diverse enough delegation in terms of women and minorities. The credentials committee, headed by Patricia Roberts Harris, rejected the entire elected delegation, including elected women and minorities, and seated an unelected delegation led by Chicago Alderman William Singer and Jesse Jackson, pledged to George McGovern.

The California primary was "winner-take-all", which was contrary to the delegate selection rules. So even though McGovern only won the California primary by a 5% electoral margin, he won all 271 of their delegates to the convention. The anti-McGovern group argued for a proportional distribution of the delegates, while the McGovern forces stressed that the rules for the delegate selection had been set and the Stop McGovern alliance was trying to change the rules after the game. The credentials committee ruled in favor of the anti-McGovern group prior to the convention, leaving McGovern short of a first-ballot majority. However, the committee was overruled by a floor vote on the first day of the convention and a unanimous McGovern delegation was seated.

McGovern recognized the mixed results of the changes that he made to the Democratic nominating convention, saying, "I opened the doors of the Democratic Party and 20 million people walked out".

The so-called "magic number", or number of delegates needed to secure the nomination, was 1,509.

== Platform ==
Formed after "divisive platform battles", the 1972 Democratic National Convention's platform has been characterized as "probably the most liberal one ever adopted by a major party in the United States". It advocated immediate withdrawal from Vietnam, amnesty for war resisters, the abolition of the draft, a guaranteed job for all Americans (it offered to "make the government the employer of last resort"), and a guaranteed family income well above the poverty line.

=== Feminism ===
The feminist movement was a major influence on the Democratic platform of 1972, and on the entire convention in general. With renewed vigor, the Democrats reaffirmed their dedication to the Equal Rights Amendment, as did the Republicans.

There were disagreements within the Democrats of the National Women's Political Caucus (NWPC), and the Women's Movement in general, over how to best approach certain issues. At the convention, Betty Friedan clashed with Gloria Steinem over the way NWPC women should approach certain issues, and whether or not they should make sure to throw all possible support behind Shirley Chisholm (both women were supporters of Chisholm's presidential campaign).

As the convention was occurring on Miami Beach, Gloria Steinem chose The Betsy Ross Hotel as headquarters for the National Organization for Women (NOW). Built in 1942, the hotel had been named after Betsy Ross, the Philadelphia seamstress who sewed American Flags.

McGovern ultimately excised the abortion issue from the party's platform; recent publications show McGovern was deeply conflicted on the issue. Actress and activist Shirley MacLaine, though privately supporting abortion rights, urged the delegates to vote against the plank. Gloria Steinem later wrote this description of the events:

The consensus of the meeting of women delegates held by the caucus had been to fight for the minority plank on reproductive freedom; indeed our vote had supported the plank nine to one. So fight we did, with three women delegates speaking eloquently in its favor as a constitutional right. One male Right-to-Life zealot spoke against, and Shirley MacLaine also was an opposition speaker, on the grounds that this was a fundamental right but didn't belong in the platform. We made a good showing. Clearly we would have won if McGovern's forces had left their delegates uninstructed and thus able to vote their consciences.

Germaine Greer flatly contradicted Steinem's account. Having recently gained public notoriety for her feminist manifesto The Female Eunuch and sparring with Norman Mailer, Greer was commissioned to cover the convention for Harper's Magazine. Greer criticized Steinem's "controlled jubilation" that 38% of the delegates were women, ignoring that "many delegations had merely stacked themselves with token females...The McGovern machine had already pulled the rug out from under them".

Greer leveled her most searing critique on Steinem for her capitulation on abortion rights. Greer reported, "Jacqui Ceballos called from the crowd to demand abortion rights on the Democratic platform, but Bella [Abzug] and Gloria stared glassily out into the room", thus killing the abortion rights platform. Greer asks, "Why had Bella and Gloria not helped Jacqui to nail him on abortion? What reticence, what loserism had afflicted them?" The cover of Harper's that month read, "Womanlike, they did not want to get tough with their man, and so, womanlike, they got screwed".

=== Gay rights ===
A coalition of gay rights groups at the convention "drew up a proposed platform provision that called for, among other things, repealing laws against homosexuals marrying". The provision was rejected by a vote of 54–34. Afterwards, however, two delegates, Jim Foster and Madeline Davis (the first openly lesbian delegate to a major national political convention), spoke publicly on its behalf.

=== Desegregation ===
The platform championed busing under its "Education" plank, stating, "Transportation of students is another tool to accomplish desegregation".

=== Welfare ===
In addition to a guaranteed job for all Americans (it offered to "make the government the employer of last resort") and a guaranteed family income above the poverty line, the McGovern platform championed the right of American welfare recipients to be represented by organizations resembling labor unions when dealing with welfare agencies.

The McGovern platform is often criticized as a "reformist coup" responsible in large part for the subsequent decline in American liberalism and chasing away the Democratic Party's "best politicians". It alienated the "working- and lower-middle class voters [who] saw [the platform] as threatening to traditional, deeply valued, if inequitable social arrangements"—so much so that one in three Democrats voted for Nixon, the Republican incumbent, in the presidential election in November. For example:

Although the McGovern platform did not promise socialism, it did pledge to eliminate—through government guarantee and dicta—any manifestation of free enterprise that could potentially produce inequality or failure. It promised to use the tax system and federal law enforcement to redistribute income and wealth. And it said the Democrats would study whether corporations should be chartered as federal institutions.

=== Right to be different ===
The Democrats also included "the right to be different" in their 1972 platform. According to the party, this right included the right to "maintain a cultural or ethnic heritage or lifestyle, without being forced into a compelled homogeneity".

== The balloting ==
=== Gallery of candidates ===
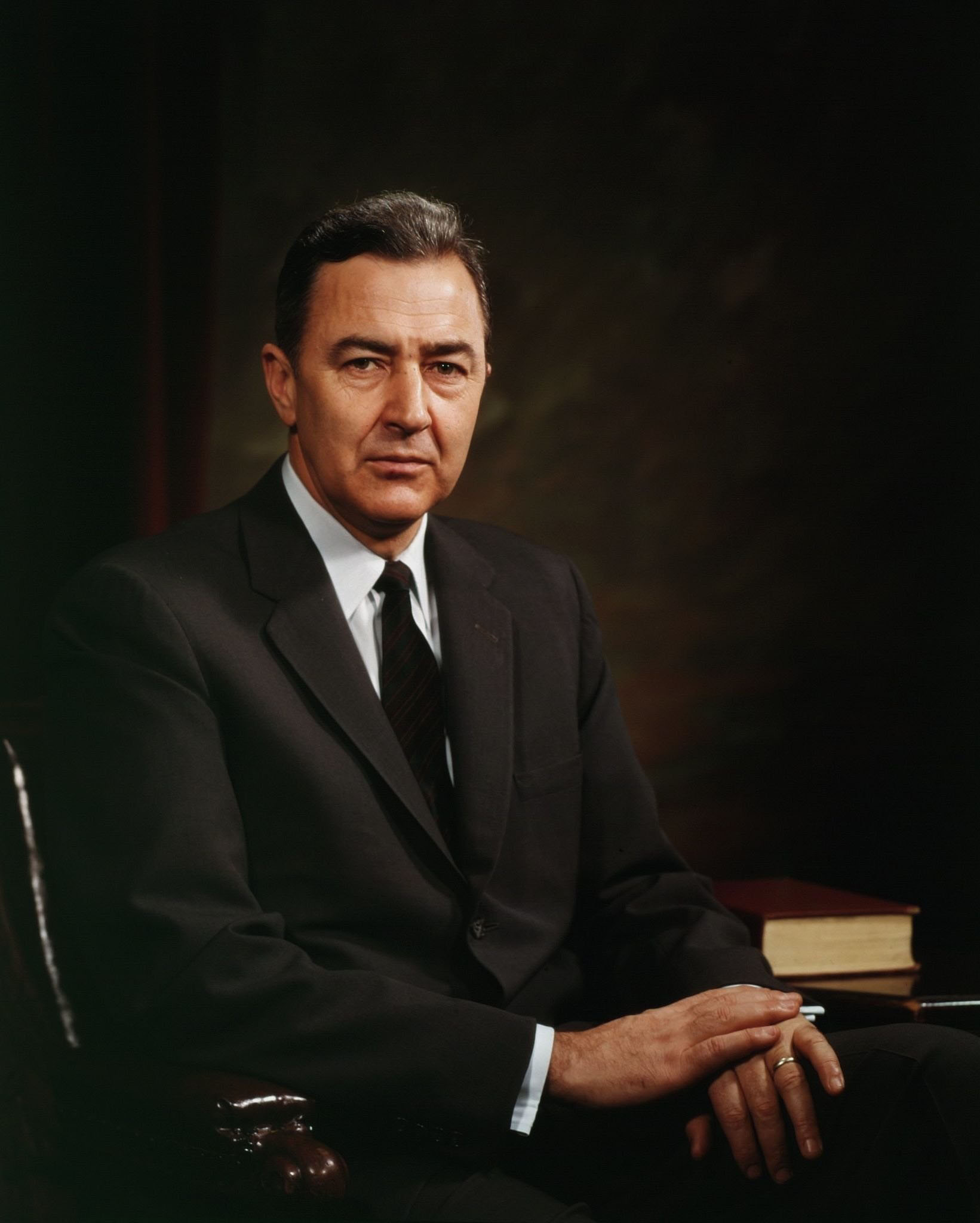
Former Senator
Eugene McCarthy
from Minnesota
(1959–1971)

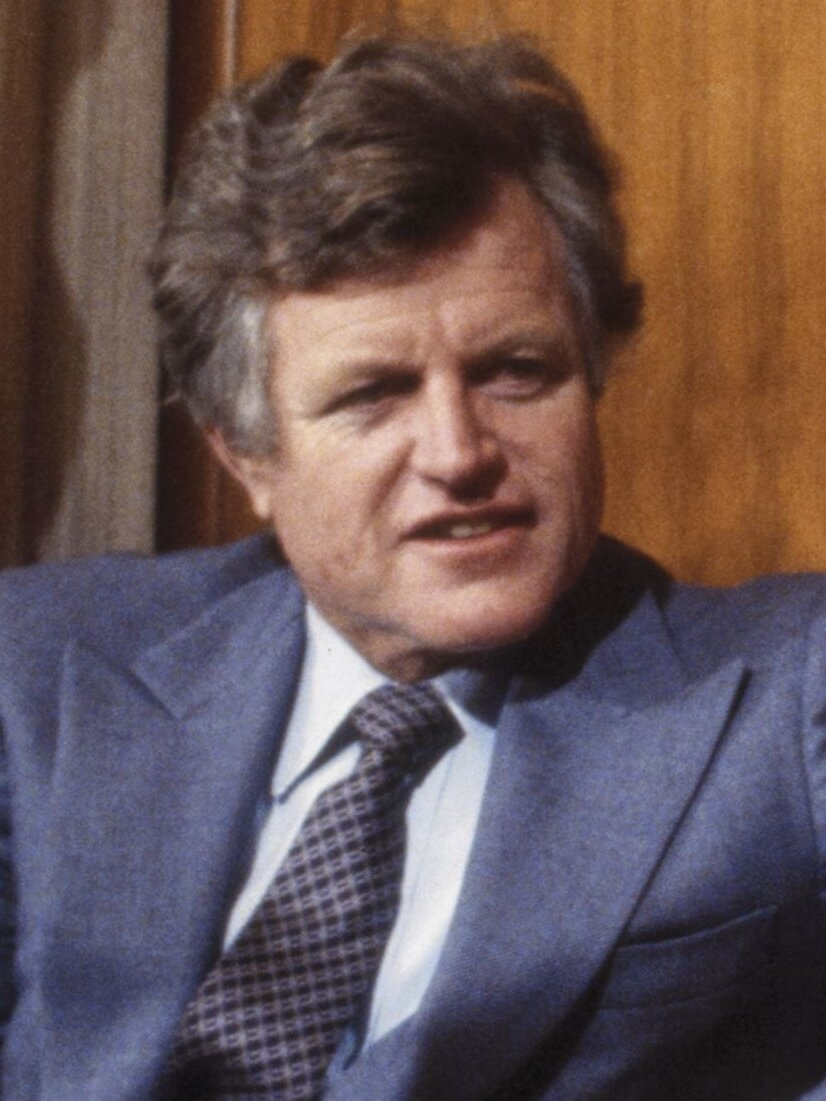
Senator
Ted Kennedy
from Massachusetts
(1962–2009)

Senator
George McGovern
from South Dakota
(1963–1981)
(presidential nominee)

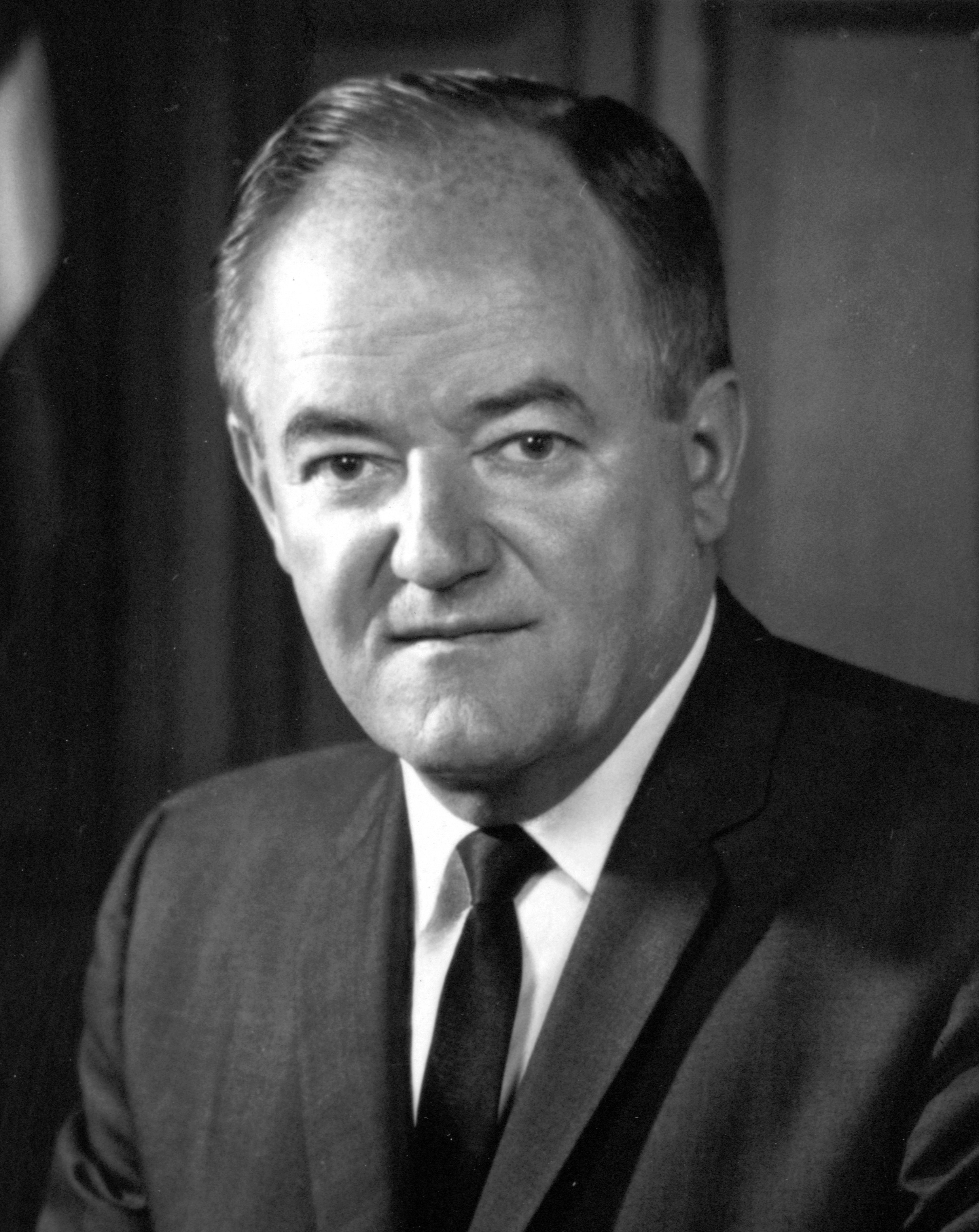
Senator
Hubert Humphrey
from Minnesota
(1949–1964, 1971–1978;
vice president of the United States 1965–1969)

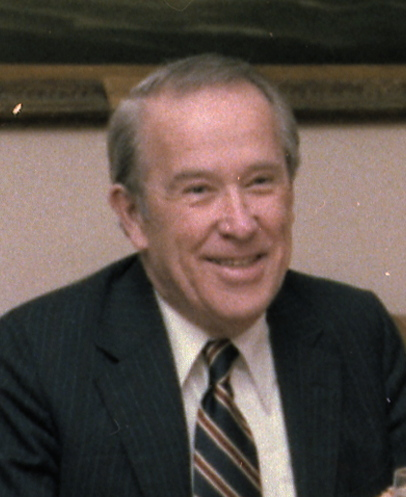
Senator
Henry M. Jackson
from Washington
(1953–1983)

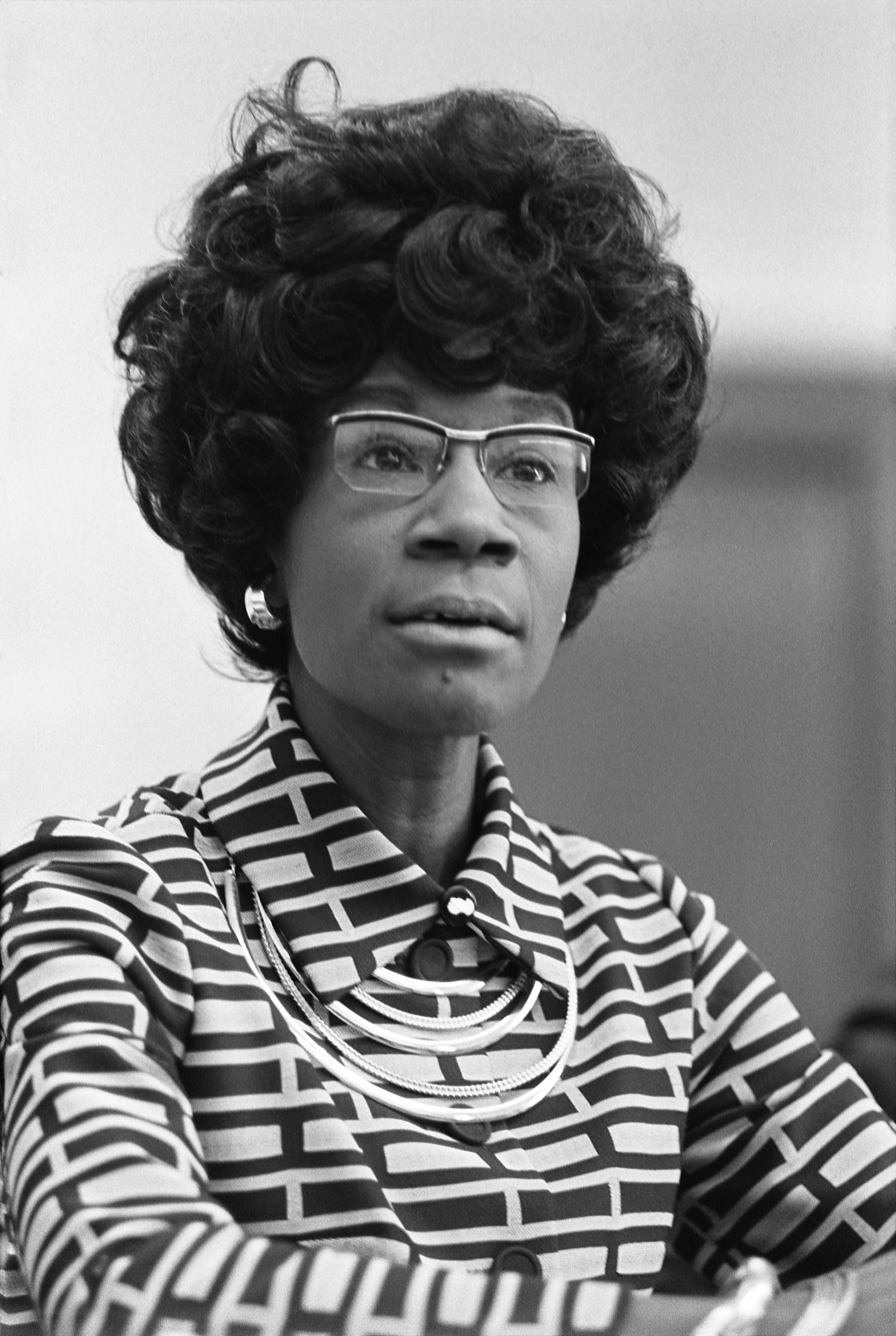
Representative
Shirley Chisholm
from New York
(1969–1983)

Governor
George Wallace
of Alabama
(1963–1967, 1971–1979, 1983–1987)

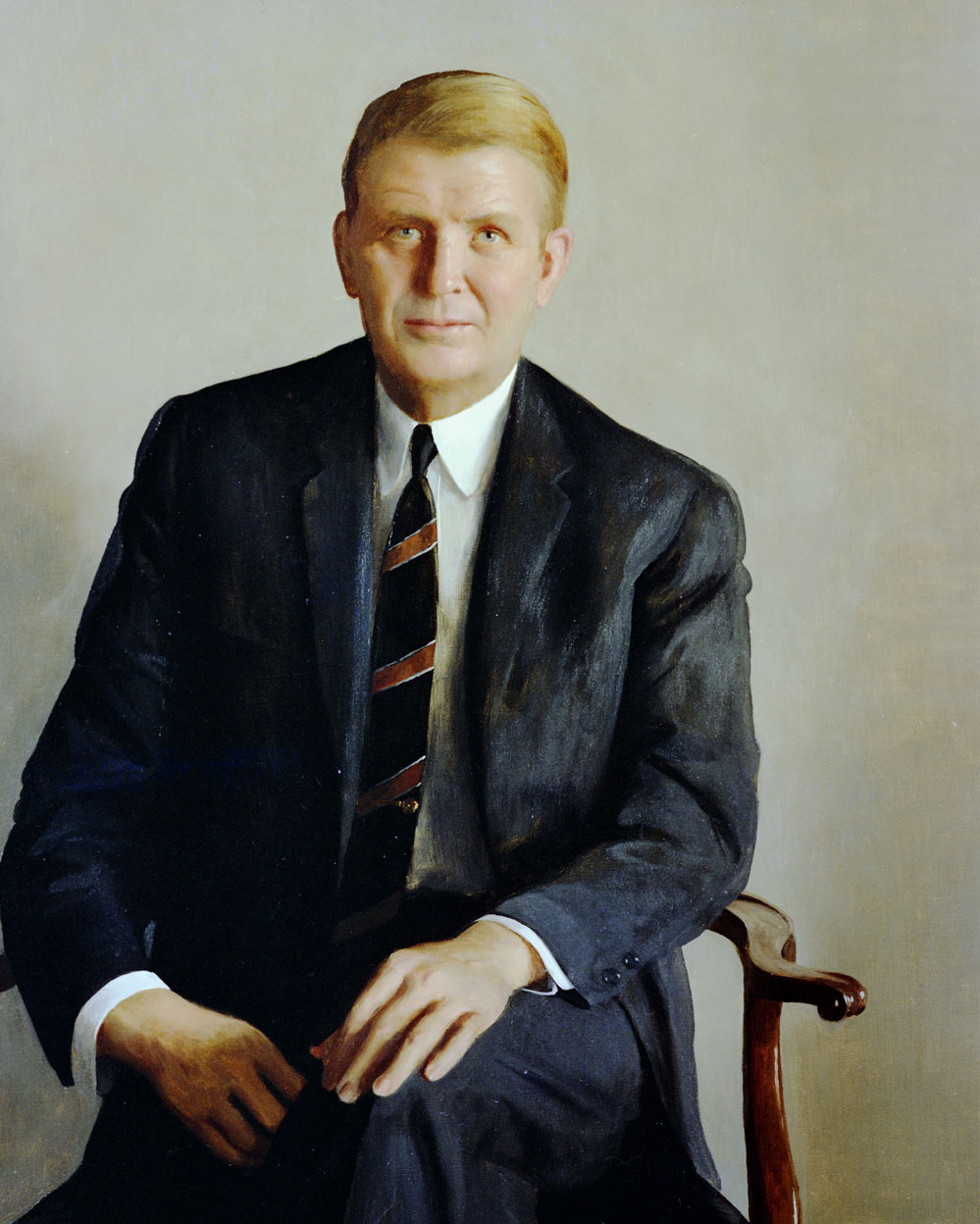
Former Governor
Terry Sanford
of North Carolina
(1961–1965)

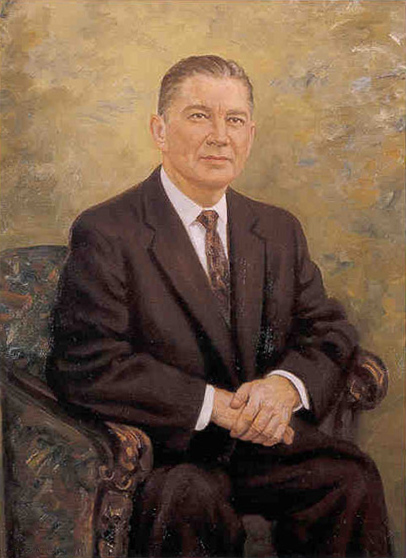
Representative
Wilbur Mills
from Arkansas
(1939–1977)

=== Delegate vote for presidential nomination ===
Candidate	Total Delegate vote	Percentage
George McGovern	1,729	57.37%
Henry M. Jackson	525	17.42%
George Wallace	382	12.67%
Shirley Chisholm	152	5.04%
Terry Sanford	78	2.59%
Hubert Humphrey	67	2.22%
Wilbur Mills	34	1.13%
Edmund Muskie	25	0.83%
Ted Kennedy	13	0.43%
Wayne Hays	5	0.17%
Eugene McCarthy	2	0.07%
Ramsey Clark	1	0.03%
Walter Mondale	1	0.03%

== Running mate ==
Most polls showed McGovern running well behind incumbent President Richard Nixon, except when McGovern was paired with Massachusetts Senator Ted Kennedy. McGovern and his campaign brain trust lobbied Kennedy heavily to accept the bid to be McGovern's running mate, but he continually refused their advances, and instead suggested U.S. Representative (and House Ways and Means Committee chairman) Wilbur Mills of Arkansas and Boston Mayor Kevin White. Offers were then made to Hubert Humphrey, Connecticut Senator Abraham Ribicoff, and Minnesota Senator Walter Mondale, all of whom turned it down.

McGovern and his campaign staff felt that a Kennedy-style figure was best to balance the ticket: a Catholic, big city-based leader with strong ties to organized labor and urban political machines. After McGovern informed Kennedy that he was seriously considering Kevin White (who had informed McGovern he was available), the Massachusetts delegation threatened to walk out of the convention if McGovern chose White, an Edmund Muskie supporter who had fought sharply with the McGovern slate during the primary. Immediately, White was dropped from consideration.

Finally, the vice presidential slot was offered to Senator Thomas Eagleton of Missouri, who was relatively unknown to many of the delegates.

The delegates insisted on nominating eight candidates for vice president, including Eagleton, Senator Mike Gravel of Alaska, former Massachusetts Governor Endicott Peabody, and Frances "Sissy" Farenthold of the Texas state house: Farenthold was the first serious female candidate for the Democratic vice president nomination since Nellie Tayloe Ross in 1928.

By the time the roll call finally began, many of the delegates were angry and wary after the protracted infighting, and combined with the last-day-of-school atmosphere of the proceedings, caused the vice-presidential balloting to become nothing short of a farce. The delegates cast ballots for a record 79 people, including many not involved in politics, as well as three deceased persons, Chinese leader Mao Zedong, and the fictional Archie Bunker.

As the vote went on, Farenthold began to attract an unexpected level of support, eventually leading to something of a grassroots campaign to nominate her over Eagleton. However, this ultimately proved too late and too disorganized to have any serious chance of denying Eagleton the nomination.

Eventually, Eagleton secured the nomination at 1:40 a.m. This delay forced the acceptance speeches of the candidates to be given well past the television prime time hours, and probably hurt the McGovern campaign by not creating the so-called "convention bounce".

Several days after the convention, it was revealed that Senator Eagleton had been hospitalized for depression and had electric shock treatment, and was also rumored to be more than a social drinker. McGovern stood behind his choice and stated that he was behind Senator Eagleton "1000 percent". The news media and many political pros, especially in the Democratic Party, lobbied hard for his removal from the ticket.

Eventually, McGovern felt compelled to accept Senator Eagleton's withdrawal from the ticket. The episode had placed McGovern in a "no-win" situation: if he kept Eagleton, the selection did not look good for the decision-making ability of the McGovern team, while if he removed Eagleton, he appeared to be weak and vacillating. Since this incident, front-running presidential candidates have developed short lists of potential running mates, and have meticulously performed background checks.

McGovern chose Sargent Shriver as his running mate a few weeks later: the McGovern-Shriver ticket went on to win electoral votes in only Massachusetts and D.C., and lost the election to incumbents Richard Nixon and Spiro Agnew by the largest percentage of the vote since 1936.

=== Delegate vote for vice-presidential nomination ===
- Thomas Eagleton – 1,742 (59.07%)
- Frances Farenthold – 405 (13.73%)
- Mike Gravel – 226 (7.66%)
- Endicott Peabody – 108 (3.66%)
- Clay Smothers – 74 (2.51%)
- Birch Bayh – 62 (2.10%)
- Peter W. Rodino – 57 (1.93%)
- Jimmy Carter – 30 (1.02%)
- Shirley Chisholm – 20 (0.68%)
- Moon Landrieu – 19 (0.64%)
- Edward T. Breathitt – 18 (0.61%)
- Ted Kennedy – 15 (0.51%)
- Fred R. Harris – 14 (0.48%)
- Richard G. Hatcher – 11 (0.37%)
- Harold Hughes – 10 (0.34%)
- Joseph Montoya – 9 (0.31%)
- William L. Guy – 8 (0.27%)
- Adlai Stevenson III – 8 (0.27%)
- Robert Bergland – 5 (0.17%)
- Hodding Carter (deceased) – 5 (0.17%)
- César Chávez – 5 (0.17%)
- Wilbur Mills – 5 (0.17%)
- Wendell Anderson – 4 (0.14%)
- Stanley Arnold – 4 (0.14%)
- Ron Dellums – 4 (0.14%)
- John J. Houlihan – 4 (0.14%)
- Roberto A. Mondragon – 4 (0.14%)
- Reubin O'Donovan Askew – 3 (0.10%)
- Herman Badillo – 3 (0.10%)
- Eugene McCarthy – 3 (0.10%)
- Claiborne Pell – 3 (0.10%)
- Terry Sanford – 3 (0.10%)
- Ramsey Clark – 2 (0.07%)
- Richard J. Daley – 2 (0.07%)
- John DeCarlo – 2 (0.07%)
- Ernest Gruening – 2 (0.07%)
- Roger Mudd – 2 (0.07%)
- Edmund Muskie – 2 (0.07%)
- Claude Pepper – 2 (0.07%)
- Abraham A. Ribicoff – 2 (0.07%)
- Hoyt Patrick Taylor Jr. – 2 (0.07%)
- Leonard F. Woodcock – 2 (0.07%)
- Bruno Agnoli – 2 (0.07%)
- Ernest Albright – 1 (0.03%)
- William A. Barrett – 1 (0.03%)
- Daniel Berrigan – 1 (0.03%)
- Philip Berrigan – 1 (0.03%)
- Julian Bond – 1 (0.03%)
- Skipper Bowles – 1 (0.03%)
- Archibald "Archie" Bunker (fictional character) – 1 (0.03%)
- Phillip Burton – 1 (0.03%)
- William Chappell – 1 (0.03%)
- Lawton Chiles – 1 (0.03%)
- Frank Church – 1 (0.03%)
- Robert Drinan – 1 (0.03%)
- Nick Galifianakis – 1 (0.03%)
- John Z. Goodrich (deceased) – 1 (0.03%)
- Michael Griffin (deceased) – 1 (0.03%)
- Martha Griffiths – 1 (0.03%)
- Charles Hamilton – 1 (0.03%)
- Patricia Harris – 1 (0.03%)
- Jim Hunt – 1 (0.03%)
- Daniel Inouye – 1 (0.03%)
- Henry M. Jackson – 1 (0.03%)
- Robert Kariss – 1 (0.03%)
- Allard K. Lowenstein – 1 (0.03%)
- Mao Zedong (non-American) – 1 (0.03%)
- Eleanor McGovern – 1 (0.03%)
- Martha Beall Mitchell – 1 (0.03%)
- Ralph Nader – 1 (0.03%)
- George Norcross Jr. – 1 (0.03%)
- Jerry Rubin – 1 (0.03%)
- Fred Seaman – 1 (0.03%)
- Joe Smith – 1 (0.03%)
- Benjamin Spock – 1 (0.03%)
- Patrick Tavolacci – 1 (0.03%)
- George Wallace – 1 (0.03%)

== See also ==
- 1972 Democratic Party presidential primaries
- 1972 Republican National Convention
- 1972 United States presidential election
- George McGovern 1972 presidential campaign
- History of the United States Democratic Party
- List of Democratic National Conventions
- United States presidential nominating convention

== General and cited references ==
- Thompson, Hunter, Fear and Loathing on the Campaign Trail '72 (1973)
- White, Theodore. The Making of the President 1972 (1972)

Preceded by 1968; Chicago, Illinois	Democratic National Conventions	Succeeded by 1976; New York, New York
