= Allen Rucker =

American writer and author (born 1945)

- Born: September 26, 1945 (age 80); Wichita Falls, Texas, U.S.
- Education: Washington University in St. Louis (BA); University of Michigan (MA); Stanford University (MA)
- Occupations: Writer; Author

Allen Rucker (born September 26, 1945) is an American writer and author. Born in Wichita Falls, Texas, and raised in Bartlesville, Oklahoma, he earned a B.A. from Washington University in St. Louis (1967), an M.A. in American Culture from the University of Michigan (1969), and another M.A. in communication from Stanford University (1977).

== Career ==
He co-founded the video documentary group TVTV, co-wrote (with Martin Mull) the award-winning cable series The History of White People in America, and wrote the Emmy Award-winning documentary "Two Days in October" for the PBS series American Experience. His nine books to date include three books on the TV series The Sopranos, including The New York Times bestseller The Sopranos Family Cookbook, and a memoir about becoming paralyzed due to transverse myelitis at the age of 50: The Best Seat In The House: How I Woke Up One Tuesday and Was Paralyzed For Life.

He has also co-written books with Martin Mull, country star Gretchen Wilson, and the book Hollywood Causes Cancer with comedian Tom Green.

== Personal life ==
Rucker lives in Los Angeles and is married with two sons. He also teaches in the School of Cinematic Arts at the University of Southern California.
