= Broadcast signal intrusion =

Type of intentional interference with wireless signals

A broadcast signal intrusion is the hijacking of broadcast signals of radio, television stations, cable television broadcast feeds or satellite signals without permission or license. Hijacking incidents have involved local TV and radio stations as well as cable and national networks.

Although television, cable, and satellite broadcast signal intrusions tend to receive more media coverage, radio station intrusions are more frequent, as many simply rebroadcast a signal received from another radio station. All that is required is an FM transmitter that can overpower the same frequency as the station being rebroadcast (limited by the inverse-square law). Other methods that have been used in North America to intrude on legal broadcasts include using a directional antenna to overpower the uplink frequency of a broadcast relay station, breaking into the transmitter area and splicing audio directly into the feed, and cyberattacks on internet-connected broadcasting equipment.

As a cable television operator connects itself in the signal path between individual stations and the system's subscribers, broadcasters have fallen victim to signal tampering on cable systems on multiple occasions.

== Notable incidents ==
=== Soviet pirate broadcasting (1960s–1980s) ===
Broadcast signal intrusions were a common practice in the Soviet Union during the 1970s and 1980s due to the absence of and high demand for any non-government broadcasting. As early as 1966, there was a report of an incident in the city of Kaluga where an 18-year-old had broadcast a hoax announcement that nuclear war had broken out with the United States.

In the mid-1970s so many pirates were operating around the city of Arkhangelsk, especially at night, that local people were urged to telephone reports of violators to a special number.

Hijackers using call signs such as "Cucumber", "Radio Millimeter", "Green Goat", "Fortune", and others, would overpower the signal on relay stations for wired radio networks to transmit their programming, or transmit into wired radio networks during gaps in regular programming. Even though the incidents appear to have been fairly common according to reports from the BBC, most were not publicly acknowledged for policy reasons. Reports in newspapers typically referred to the hijackers as "radio hooligans broadcasting drivel, rudeness, vulgarity, uncensored expressions, and trashy music". State news organizations also spread propaganda against such pirate broadcasters, claiming that they had interfered with a state frequency used by Aeroflot, "preventing a doctor in an air ambulance from transmitting information about a patient".

=== Southern Television (1977) ===
On November 26, 1977, an audio message, purporting to come from outer space and conveyed by an individual named 'Vrillon' of the 'Ashtar Galactic Command', was broadcast during an ITN news bulletin on Southern Television in the United Kingdom. The intrusion did not entirely affect the video signal but replaced the program audio with a six-minute speech about the destiny of the human race and a disaster to affect "your world and the beings on our worlds around you." The IBA confirmed that it was the first time such a transmission had been made.

=== "Telewizja Solidarność" (TV Solidarity) (1985) ===
In September 1985, four astronomers at Poland's University of Toruń (Zygmunt Turło, Leszek Zaleski, Piotr Łukaszewski, and Jan Hanasz) used a ZX Spectrum home computer, a synchronizing circuit, and a transmitter to superimpose messages in support of the labor movement Solidarność (Solidarity) over state-run television broadcasts in Toruń, including an episode of 07 zgłoś się. The messages read "Dość podwyżek cen, kłamstw I represji. Solidarność Toruń" ("Enough price increases, lies, and repressions. Solidarity Toruń") and "Bojkot wyborów naszym obowiązkiem." ("It is our duty to boycott the election", referring to the Sejm elections of 1985) with the Solidarity logo. The four men were eventually discovered and were charged with "possession of an unlicensed radio transmitter and publication of materials that could cause public unrest". At their sentencing, the judge noted their prize-winning work in the Polish scientific community and gave each of them probation and a fine of the equivalent of US$100 each (or 3,000,000 old złoty, 300 PLN in today's currency).

=== Captain Midnight (1986) ===
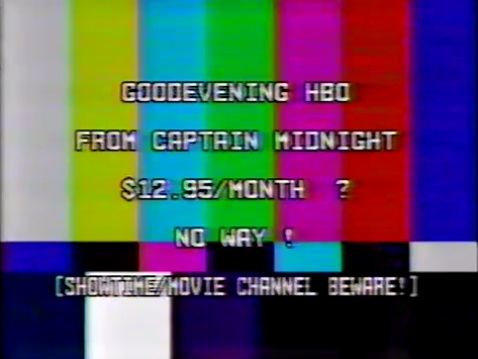
MacDougall's message as seen by HBO viewers, over the SMPTE color bars

At 12:32 a.m. Eastern Time on April 27, 1986, HBO (Home Box Office) had its satellite signal feed from its operations center on Long Island in Hauppauge, New York interrupted by a man calling himself "Captain Midnight". The interruption occurred during a presentation of The Falcon and the Snowman. The intrusion lasted between 4 and 5 minutes and was seen by viewers along the East Coast. The man, who during the interruption also threatened to hijack the signals of Showtime and The Movie Channel, was later caught and identified as John R. MacDougall of Ocala, Florida. He was prosecuted shortly thereafter. Authorities were tipped off by a man from Wisconsin in a phone booth at a rest area of Interstate 75 in Gainesville, Florida. The man filing the report said that he overheard MacDougall bragging about the incident.

MacDougall's guilt was confirmed by an FCC investigation that showed he was alone at Central Florida Teleport at the time of the incident, and a recording of the jamming video showed that the text was created by a character generator at that location. He was charged with transmitting without a radio license in violation of 47 U.S.C. § 301. MacDougall pled guilty and was fined $5,000 and served a year of probation. Ambiguity about whether the 47 USC 301 charge was applicable since the transmitter had a license resulted in the passage of 18 U.S.C. § 1367 which made satellite jamming a felony.

MacDougall was able to perform the intrusion while working a second job as a master control operator at a satellite teleport in Florida, where he worked to make ends meet due to declining income from his satellite TV equipment business. He stated that he did it because he was frustrated with HBO's service rates and that it was hurting his business selling satellite dishes (hence his second job at the teleport). The message, placed over SMPTE color bars, broadcast by MacDougall read:

GOODEVENING [sic] HBO
FROM CAPTAIN MIDNIGHT
$12.95/MONTH ?
NO WAY !
[SHOWTIME/MOVIE CHANNEL BEWARE!]

=== The Playboy Channel religious message (1987) ===
A broadcast of the movie "Three Daughters" on the Playboy Channel was disrupted with a text-only religious message on Sunday, September 6, 1987. The message read, "Thus sayeth the Lord thy God: Remember the Sabbath and keep it holy. Repent for the kingdom of Heaven is at hand." (From the Bible verses Exodus 20:8 and Matthew 4:17.)

Thomas Haynie, an employee of the Christian Broadcasting Network, was convicted of satellite piracy in connection with the incident. Haynie, who pleaded his innocence, was the first person convicted under a new federal law which had made satellite hacking a felony following the Captain Midnight incident.

According to investigators, it was the religious content of the transmission and the type of equipment used that drew them to CBN. The jamming signal left behind subtle technical clues that were captured on a VHS recording made at the Playboy Channel's uplink at the time of the event – like finding "fingerprints" in the video. After investigators were confident that they identified the brand of transmitter and character generator from the video, they concluded that CBN was the culprit. Haynie, of Virginia Beach, Virginia, was on duty at his job as an uplink engineer at the time of the jamming.

CBN maintained that the FCC's case was entirely circumstantial, since there were no witnesses and the signal could not be traced to a point of origin. During the investigation, experts on both sides attempted to recreate the incident with CBN's equipment. According to CBN spokesman Dino McCann, they were unsuccessful. Furthermore, CBN asserted that there was not enough power for Haynie to jam Playboy's signal but during the trial, government witnesses said the CBN station was capable of interfering with satellite transmissions.

After initially being deadlocked, the jury eventually sided with the prosecution and convicted Haynie on two of six counts. (Haynie was acquitted of similar charges of interfering with the American Exxxtasy channel; a recording of the event was of such poor quality that it was unusable.) Haynie received three years of probation, a $1,000 fine, and 150 hours of community service.

=== Max Headroom incidents (1987) ===
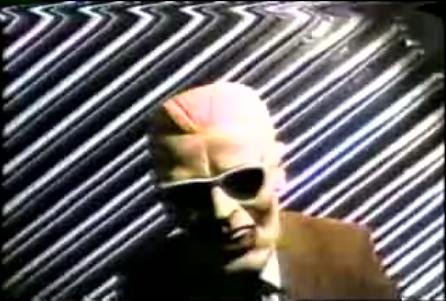
Screenshot of the Max Headroom hijacker

On the night of November 22, 1987, an unknown man wearing a Max Headroom mask appeared on the signals of two television stations in Chicago, Illinois. WGN-TV, owned by Tribune Broadcasting, was hijacked first. The intrusion occurred during the sports report on its 9:00 p.m. newscast and lasted about 25 seconds. Next came PBS affiliate WTTW, where the man was seen and heard uttering garbled remarks before dropping his pants, partially exposing his buttocks, and was then spanked with a flyswatter by a woman wearing a French maid costume before normal programming resumed. This second interception occurred at about 11:00 p.m. during an episode of the Doctor Who serial, "Horror of Fang Rock", and lasted almost 90 seconds. None of the individuals responsible for the intrusion have been determined. This incident got the attention of the CBS Evening News the next day and was talked about nationwide. The HBO incident was also mentioned in the same news report.

=== Falun Gong hijackings (2002) ===
On February 16, 2002, television signals in the Chinese city of Anshan were briefly hijacked by members of the Falun Gong religious movement in order to clarify the events of the Tiananmen Square self-immolation incident of the previous year. On March 5, 2002, further intrusions took place on cable television channels in the cities of Changchun and Songyuan, protesting persecution by the Chinese government. Different sources vary as to the length of the intrusion, with figures cited including 10 minutes, 50 minutes or even as long as four hours. In September of the same year, 15 people were convicted of roles in the incident and were given prison terms of up to 20 years. On September 9, Falun Gong followers again disrupted broadcasting, this time targeting nationwide satellite broadcasting. By 2010, several of those involved had reportedly died in prison.

=== WBLI and WBAB (2006) ===
On the morning of Wednesday, May 17, 2006, the signal of Babylon, New York, FM radio station WBAB was hijacked for about 90 seconds while the signal jammers broadcast the song "Nigger Hatin' Me" by 1960s-era white supremacist country singer Johnny Rebel. Roger Luce, the station's morning host, said at the time, "I've never seen this in 22 years on this radio station [...] Whatever that was [...] it was very racist." Former program director John Olsen said, "This was not some child's prank, this was a federal offense."

The hijack was likely accomplished by overpowering the studio transmitter link (STL) signal to the transmitter in Dix Hills. A signal hijacking with the same song happened to WBLI, WBAB's sister station, about two weeks earlier on a Sunday night.

=== Zombie apocalypse Emergency Alert System hijackings (2013) ===
On February 11, 2013, Great Falls, Montana, CBS affiliate KRTV had their Emergency Alert System hijacked with an audible message warning viewers that "the bodies of the dead are rising from their graves and attacking the living." Later the same night in Marquette, Michigan, and the early morning hours in La Crosse, Wisconsin, the same type of hijacking and reference to a "zombie invasion" was made over the EAS systems of CBS affiliate WKBT-DT, ABC affiliate WBUP and PBS member station WNMU during primetime programming. Shortly afterward, PBS affiliate KENW of Portales, New Mexico, was struck with a similar hacking incident, repeating similar information regarding zombies.

=== MNCTV and TPI (2015) ===
In 2014, Tutut announced plans for relaunch of the original TPI, although it has yet to materialize. In October 2015, MNCTV's Jakarta frequencies suffered from broadcast signal intrusions in which color bars reading "TPI 37 UHF" appeared for a brief period of time. Tutut's TPI denied the responsibility for the hijacking.

=== "The Winker's Song (Misprint)" incidents (2017) ===
In June and July 2017, Mansfield 103.2 FM, a local radio station in Mansfield, Nottinghamshire, England in the United Kingdom, had its signal intruded at least eight times during outside broadcasts. During these intrusions, "The Winker's Song (Misprint)" was played. As of July 2017, the perpetrator had not been identified.

== During armed conflicts ==
=== Arab-Israeli conflict ===
During the 2006 Lebanon War, Israel overloaded the satellite transmission of Hezbollah's Al Manar TV to broadcast anti-Hezbollah propaganda. One spot showed Hezbollah leader Hassan Nasrallah with crosshairs superimposed on his image, followed by three gunshots and a voice saying "Your day is coming," and shots of the Israeli Air Force destroying targets in Lebanon.

During the 2014 Gaza War, Hamas hacked Channel 10 (Israel) with messages threatening Israelis to stay longer in the bomb shelters and showing pictures of the wounded Gazans.

On March 11, 2016, private satellite dish owners in Israel watching HaAh HaGadol (the Israeli version of Big Brother) on Channel 2 had their show interrupted by propaganda videos from Hamas. The disruption lasted a little over three and a half minutes.

On November 30, 2016, as a form of protest against Israel's newly implemented "Mu'adhin bill" which called for the silencing of the adhan (the Islamic call to prayer), a group of hackers from Saudi Arabia invaded the transmissions of the Israeli TV networks Channel 2 and Channel 10 with messages related to the November 2016 Israel fires accompanied by the adhan as background audio. Additionally, the visual content of the hijack included a message written in Hebrew alluding to divine retribution and punishment from God. An investigation found that only satellites in mostly Arab communities were affected.

During the 2025 Twelve-Day War, Iran's state television service IRIB was hacked by Israeli hackers who aired a footage of women protesting against hijab and cutting their hair along with a background voice calling for public outrage against the "regime". Reportedly the intrusion was done with the help of satellites, as a result, affecting only the satellite television viewers.

=== Russian invasion of Ukraine (2022–2023) ===
On February 26, 2022, the hacker group Anonymous, as part of the cyber war declared to Russia, hacked several pro-Kremlin TV channels (Channel One Russia, Russia-1 and others), broadcasting a poem written by the singer Monatik about the Russo-Ukrainian war with its footage and Ukrainian music.

On May 9, 2022, during Russia's Victory Day parade in Moscow, Russian TV listings were hacked to display information about Russia's war crimes, and to protest Russia's invasion of Ukraine using various messages. The names of every TV station were changed to "blood is on your hands" and other phrases used in the TV listings included "television and the authorities are lying" and "your hands are covered in blood from the deaths of thousands of Ukrainians and their children".

On June 5, 2023, Russian radio stations in regions bordering Ukraine were hacked, broadcasting a fake radio address claiming to be from Putin, declaring martial law, a nationwide military mobilization, and for residents to evacuate deeper into Russia.

== Other incidents ==
=== Television signal intrusions ===
From October 1 to 4, 1959, the entire video portions of the first three 1959 World Series games on then-primary CBS/secondary NBC-ABC station WLUC-TV in Marquette, Michigan had its Lathrop microwave relay station blacked out by a disgruntled former WLUC employee who wanted to bring back his engineering job after being fired by the station's manager John Borgen for "insubordination reasons". Borgen said in a statement that the former employee, 36-year-old Harold William Lindgren of Marquette, suffered mental health issues and planned his own revenge to the station by swiping a steel wool scouring pad from his wife's sink and drove thirty five miles south to Lathrop on the evening of September 30, before climbing a fence around the transmitter and used a ball-point pen before stuffing the pad into a pipe of the relay equipment the following evening, calling the interruption "a diabolical plot". The hijacks immediately led engineers from Chicago and Green Bay to investigate for four days before Lindgren was quickly arrested by Michigan State Police and immediately facing a possible four-year jail sentence. Lindgren told court officials that he wanted to "jam the signal" over his frustration at Borgen for firing Lindgren several weeks beforehand on September 10, 1959.

On October 27, 1968, a 25-year-old technician from San Bernardino, California, was arrested by local authorities after he accidentally hijacked the off-air airwaves of then-new ABC affiliate KPLM-TV in Palm Springs, California, replacing the station's test pattern shortly after the station was signed off, with a stag film for approximately 15 minutes. The man, Allen Veatch, was alone in the studio that morning when he watched the stag videotape in the studio, which led to its signal feeding into the line going to the commercial cable company distribution center which was still hooked up, and the program was shown to the public.

In 1971, several television stations in Manila complained of unauthorized broadcasts of pornographic films–known in local vernacular as bomba films–being aired on their channels at midnight after the stations' sign-off. They were receivable only in Manila and in the neighboring city of Makati, indicating the usage of a weaker transmitter, and were of poor quality and had no sound. Leonardo Garcia of the Radio Control Office hypothesized that the culprit was either misusing television equipment or was an "amateur electronic buff", and wryly observed, "Whoever he is, he must be a good Catholic. He stopped showing bombas during Holy Week."

In late-February 1977, a station technician accidentally inserted an unidentified pornographic movie during a late-night showing of the early Gary Cooper movie Only the Brave on WORA-TV in Mayagüez, Puerto Rico. According to the station's operator, he responded that he accidentally pulled a wrong switch and the pornographic material was sent into thousands of home screens. Shortly afterward, the management fired the technician.

On July 26, 1980, Fred Barber, then-vice president and general manager for WSB-TV in Atlanta, Georgia, told The Atlanta Constitution that he fired two longtime master control operators from the station after they purposely replaced two seconds of a Georgia Forestry Commission commercial in-between an airing of The Bugs Bunny Show and The Godzilla/Globetrotters Adventure Hour with a still-photo of a naked woman appearing on screen. Barber said that the two fired operators were known to be responsible for signing the station off the air and back on the air, and replied that the nighttime operator at the time was apparently in a habit of leaving random pieces on tape. At the time of the incident, one of the station's morning employees failed to notice the video and it mistakenly aired on broadcast.

On November 10, 1982, 30 seconds of an overnight broadcast of the movie The Green Slime on then-new WVAH-TV in Charleston, West Virginia were replaced with pornographic movie content recorded from the Escapade Channel. Manager Gary Dreispul stated that the station's technician mistakenly hit a patch panel and walked away before looking at the on-air monitor. Horrified upon realizing his mistake, the technician ran back to the panel and pressed the button to go dark. Dreispul stated that the technician was suspended pending the investigation and called the incident a "very bad and careless mistake".

On February 12, 1984, at approximately 11:10 a.m., the local TVE1 relay serving Porto, located in Santo Ovídio in Vila Nova de Gaia and operating on VHF channel 7, was interrupted for approximately 35 minutes by TV Maravilha, a pirate television project. The group constructed a low-power video transmitter from salvaged equipment and broadcast from a location near the relay's receiving equipment, transmitting on the same frequency as the incoming TVE1 signal. The stronger nearby signal overrode the broadcast, interrupting a live equestrian sports event and replacing it with a test pattern showing the words “TV MARAVILHA – PORTO” and “Em breve emissões regulares” ("Regular broadcasts soon"). The intrusion apparently was intended to provoke public debate about the liberalization of television broadcasting in Portugal, where television was still a state monopoly. Despite announcing future programming, TV Maravilha never broadcast again.

On December 24, 1985, an unidentified engineer from CBS affiliate WSBT-TV in South Bend, Indiana was fired after abruptly replacing 20 to 30 minutes of CBS News Nightwatch with pornographic content from the Playboy Channel alongside a movie entitled Birds in Paradise. The station's president, E. Barry Smith, told the South Bend Tribune that the unidentified employee flipped a satellite-tuner switch during the first twenty-to-thirty minutes of the Nightwatch broadcast and was quickly dismissed by the station's management before publicly apologizing to the station's viewers.

On December 11, 1986, an overnight rebroadcast of an episode of The Love Boat on NBC affiliate KTVV-TV in Austin, Texas went overboard after a master control operator mistakenly spliced its satellite feed and replaced eight seconds of the first batch of commercials with hardcore pornographic content from the Playboy Channel. The station's then-general manager, Jane Wallace, told the Austin American-Statesman that the operator was getting ready to run a commercial, but hit the wrong button.

During the second inning from Game 1 of the 1988 World Series (known for Kirk Gibson's famous walk-off home run) on October 15, 1988, an unidentified technician from NBC affiliate WMGT-TV in Macon, Georgia, was fired after the station's on-air feed replaced ten seconds of the World Series with a black-and-white pornographic film during the network's broadcast. The broadcast signal hijacking made statewide headlines. The station's manager, L.A. Sturdivant, released a statement explaining that the broadcast intrusion was triggered by accident rather than deliberately planned, and was being "treated as a serious matter." After three days of investigation, Sturdivant identified the most likely cause as being the since-fired technician having accidentally flipped the wrong switch on a master control panel, causing the NBC broadcast to switch from the KU-Band World Series-carrying signal over to the C-Band X-rated material-carrying satellite signal. Despite most likely having occurred at the station's studio, the station control panel's wiring was rerouted during the investigation. Officials put forth other theories that could explain the incident, such as a videotape having been brought into the studio and watched by the technician, or deliberate sabotage from an outside prankster, in similar fashion to WSB-TV's 1980 broadcast signal interruption, but Sturdivant let it be known he still believed an accidental signal switching to be the most likely cause.

On February 12, 1990, an unauthorized local television station known as TV Nordeste interrupted the local retransmission of RTP2 in Bragança, Portugal, by transmitting its own signal on the same frequency near a local relay transmitter. After the channel's evening news bulletin, RTP2's programming was replaced by a test pattern with the station's identification, footage of Bragança, traditional music and a local news programme featuring press conferences and a football match summary. The broadcast was transmitted through a private relay that normally rebroadcast RTP2's signal. The incident was reportedly intended as a protest against the lack of coverage of the Trás-os-Montes region in Portuguese television and it caused political consequences. The private transmitter was eventually dismounted and this was TV Nordeste's only broadcast

On December 11, 1998, workers staged an industrial action at the transmission site for the São Paulo station of the failing Brazilian television network Rede Manchete, hijacking the signal and replacing it with a slideshow containing employees' grievances with the network, including messages such as "We haven't been paid for 3 months", as well as impromptu promotion for a charity concert for affected employees of the network.

On February 10, 1999, a repeat broadcast of The Simpsons on KFXK-TV in Longview, Texas was briefly interrupted by four seconds of a pornographic movie. The station's manager, Mark McCay, reported to the Associated Press that quick reactions from station employees immediately ended the hijack by inserting a 20-second promotional ad for the station and resuming the Simpsons episode. After several minutes, a character generator scroll appeared on-screen apologizing to the viewers and promising an investigation. The unidentified technician who was responsible for viewing the tape was dismissed 40 minutes after the incident.

On January 4, 2000, a broadcast of the children's television series Teletubbies on GMA Network in the Philippines was replaced by a still photo of actress Rosanna Roces for several seconds. The photo showed one of Roces's breasts exposed, prompting a warning from the Movie and Television Review and Classification Board (MTRCB). GMA officials stated that the incident was accidental, and was caused by an errant employee who pressed a button whilst helping repair a computer.

On January 3, 2007, in Australia, during a broadcast of an episode of the Canadian television series Mayday (known in Australia as Air Crash Investigation) on the Seven Network, an audio signal unexpectedly started playing, clearly saying in an American accent, "Jesus Christ, help us all, Lord. Fuсk!" This same voice message continued to repeat itself over and over during the show for a total of six minutes. A spokesman for Seven later denied that the transmission was a prank or a security breach and claimed that the repeated line was part of the original broadcast and said, "Jesus Christ, one of the Nazarenes", although there is hardly any similarity between the two phrases. A subsequent investigation by independent researchers revealed that the invading transmission was actually from a videotaped news broadcast of a civilian truck being ambushed in the Iraq War on September 20, 2005. It remains unknown whether or not this was an intentional act of television piracy or a genuine glitch of some sort.

On March 12, 2007, during a 9 p.m. airing of an Ion Life rebroadcast of a Tom Brokaw-hosted NBC special, State of U.S. Health Care, on Phoenix, Arizona, TV station KPPX-TV, a station employee inserted about 30 seconds of a pornographic film into the broadcast, prompting telephone calls to local news media outlets and the local cable provider, Cox Communications. Parent company Ion Media Networks conducted a rigorous investigation into what they called "an intolerable act of human sabotage", and shortly thereafter, announced that the employee found to be responsible had been fired, threatening further legal action.

On June 17, 2007, an intrusion incident occurred on Czech Television's Sunday morning program Panorama, which shows panoramic shots of Prague and various locations across the country, especially mountain resorts. One of the cameras, located in Černý Důl in the Giant Mountains, had been tampered with on-site and its video stream was replaced with the hackers' own, which contained CGI of a small nuclear explosion in the local landscape, ending in white noise. The broadcast looked authentic enough; the only clue for the viewers was the Web address of the artist group Ztohoven, which had already performed several reality hacking incidents before. Czech Television considered legal action against the group, and tourism workers in the area expressed outrage (since the program serves to promote tourism in the areas shown).

On July 13, 2007, a grainy photo of a man and woman interrupted Washington, D.C., ABC affiliate WJLA-TV's digital or HD signal. The picture was not transmitted over the analog signal, however. The incident was deemed a genuine signal intrusion by various websites but has since been confirmed to be the result of an older HDTV encoder malfunctioning in the early morning hours and going undetected. Station management stated that the image was from an advertisement for The Oprah Winfrey Show.

On October 4, 2016, FEMA claimed responsibility for what appeared to have been a hijacking of Utica, New York TV station WKTV foreshadowing the disaster, which was under independent investigation by Snopes. FEMA told Snopes that they were conducting cross-nation tests for the EAS test and development message aggregators, using lines from various Dr. Seuss books as placeholder messages, when WKTV's EAS device mistakenly relayed to the public the messages it received in its testing environment. The chosen verse from Green Eggs and Ham and its proximity to Hoboken was purely coincidental, and FEMA had no culpability in the train crash.

In March 2017, intruders broadcast pornographic content for approximately 15 minutes on Touba TV, an Islamic TV channel in Senegal run by the Mouride Sufi order. In a statement, the channel's management "unreservedly condemn[ed] this criminal act which seems to be sabotage and a satanic trick".

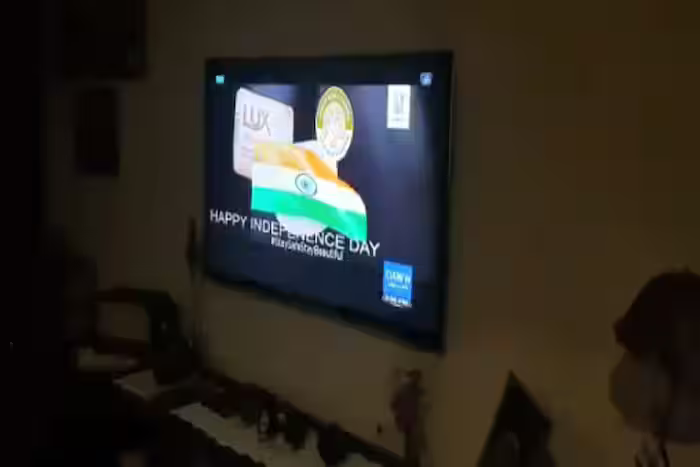
Dawn News intrusion, displaying India's national flag.

In August 2020, Pakistani television news channel Dawn News was compromised by Indian hackers. At around 3:30 pm IST, while a commercial was being broadcast, it displayed an overlay of the Indian national flag with the message “Happy Independence Day” (referring to August 15 Independence Day of India). Dawn News issued a statement saying they are investigating the matter.

On October 8, 2022, during the Mahsa Amini protests in Iran, the state-run TV channel Islamic Republic TV was hacked by a group going by the name of "Adalat Ali". The screen briefly showed a man in a mask, before switching to a black screen containing Ali Khamenei, the Supreme Leader, engulfed in CGI flames with a target on his forehead; pictures of four women recently killed in the protests; and the audio message "Women, life, freedom" on repeat. The hack lasted 12 seconds, before cutting back to a bewildered TV presenter.

In February 2023, the Romanian public television broadcaster TVR was hijacked twice by a person from Prahova County who managed to hijack a transmission from the Craiova branch of TVR. A message was transmitted, which did not appear on the screen (a test card appeared), but on the monitors in the directorate. The message was as follows:

“Către Televiziunea Română. Aștept cu drag după telejurnal ca cineva de la tehnic să mă contacteze pentru a discuta breșele de securitate descoperite și despre problemele pe care le-am văzut pe posturi. Văd că cineva vă tot sabotează. Vă voi lăsa adresa de mail la final de jurnal. Cu drag, un telespectator fidel” (“To Romanian Television. I look forward after the news to be contacted by a technician to discuss the discovered security breaches and the problems I saw on the TV channels. I see that someone keeps sabotaging you. I will leave an e-mail address at the end of the news report. With love, a loyal viewer.”)

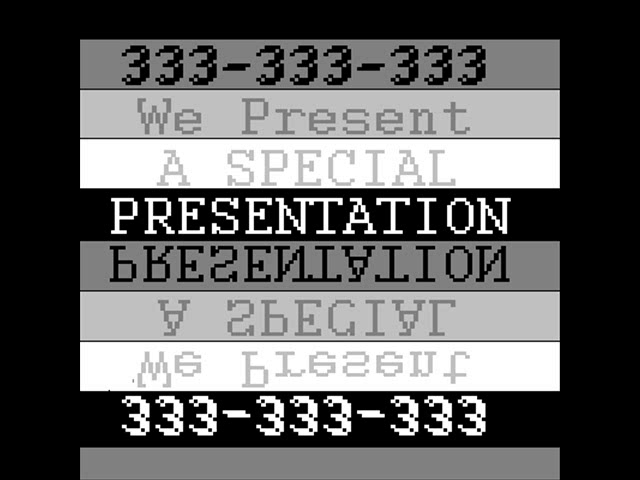
The Wyoming Incident

On July 29, 2025, a broadcast intrusion occurred on the Brazilian TV channel Record, which was reporting on the 2025 Midtown Manhattan shooting. The hijackers displayed a video of 2007 internet ARG The Wyoming Incident, an analog horror game centering around a fictional broadcast intrusion.

On March 1, 2026, Iran's state-run television channel was hacked, replacing standard broadcasting with videos of Israeli prime minister Benjamin Netanyahu.

On June 1, 2026, Jak TV, a regional television station from Jakarta, Indonesia, was affected by a hijacking by an unknown party. The hijacker replaced the broadcast material that was being broadcast with screenshots from a YouTube channel with the username @GrimPlaysStuff (the username of which was previously linked to hijackings of several American radio stations), which were placed randomly all over the screen, as well as a video containing pornographic acts which was placed in the middle of the screen. This incident sparked various reactions and criticism from the public on various social media platforms. Jak TV issued an official statement stating that there had been "interference with their broadcast signal," and that their team was conducting an investigation regarding this incident. Following this incident, GrimPlaysStuff would make a now deleted YouTube video responding to it and the aforementioned past radio broadcast incidents, stating that he has nothing to do with the situations. He would soon delete most of his social media accounts, similar to what happened after the previous incident, but they have continued to stay deleted this time.

=== Cable network feed intrusions ===
On October 20, 1979, a Cablevision headend in Canada replaced Channel 10's message channel's feed with a couple of minutes from the pornographic film Deep Throat. According to the community channel president Ron East, the mistake happened due to a young volunteer operator showing off a rock festival video to his friends that had footage from the film on it accidently broadcasting it by pressing the wrong button.

On April 27, 1983, a Cox Cable headend in Santa Barbara, California, replaced the video feed of KNXT's Channel 2 Eyewitness News with softcore pornography for 15 minutes, while audio of the newscast was still presented throughout its entirety. Tom Pratt, the programmer manager for Cox, said that the hijack was affected for not all of the viewership's households, but added that the "incident was not accidental". Cox contacted the local authorities to investigate the situation. Despite staff at Cox receiving no reports or complaints from the public (with the exception of two journalists who witnessed the incident), reports from the following morning stated that the employees did witness the movie beforehand.

On May 2, 2007, a Comcast headend replaced six minutes of a rerun of the Handy Manny episode "Pet Problem/Felipe's New Job" on the Disney Channel with hardcore pornography for viewers in Lincroft, New Jersey. Comcast stated it was investigating the event's cause, but did not announce its findings to the public.

On February 1, 2009, a Comcast headend in Tucson, Arizona, replaced NBC affiliate KVOA's signal with graphic footage from the pornographic video Wild Cherries 5 in portions of Arizona for 28 seconds, interrupting Super Bowl XLIII between the Arizona Cardinals and the Pittsburgh Steelers during the fourth quarter. Comcast claimed "Our initial investigation suggests this was an isolated malicious act. We are conducting a thorough investigation to determine who was behind this." KVOA also announced that it will be investigating the incident. On February 4, 2011, 38-year-old former Cox Cable employee Frank Tanori Gonzalez of Marana was arrested by the FBI and local police about the case. Later that October, Gonzalez pleaded guilty to two counts of computer tampering and was sentenced to three years of probation, as well as a $1,000 fine to the Arizona attorney general's anti-racketeering fund.

In the morning hours of March 16, 2010, Raleigh area Time Warner Cable's transmission from both Kids and Kids Preschool On Demand channels in the Research Triangle counties of Johnston, Wake, Wayne, and Wilson in North Carolina (including the cities of Raleigh and Goldsboro) was replaced by Playboy TV for approximately two hours, while other TWC cable systems in the area outside the four counties only showed a black screen. An executive from TWC stated to local news station WRAL that it "was a technical malfunction that caused the wrong previews to be shown" on their kids' on-demand channels.

On April 20, 2012, three minutes of a gay pornographic film was broadcast during a morning news show on the Channel Zero-owned independent station CHCH-DT in Hamilton, Ontario, for Shaw Cable viewers. The night before, a cable was cut; while it was being fixed on the morning of the incident, the adult programming was spliced into CHCH's feed.

=== Satellite feed intrusions ===
On September 7, 2012, the Disney Junior block on Disney Channel was interrupted on Dish Network, replacing six minutes of Lilo & Stitch with a portion of a hardcore pornographic movie.

=== Radio signal intrusions ===
The BBC's radio broadcast of a musical program on October 14, 1941 was interrupted by Nazi Germans shouting false statements to Britons on "how much money Winston Churchill has been paid by Germans," and saying that "the Germans have being swindled and was led up the garden path and sold to America." The voice led to a target of "Harassing Harry", a counterpart of Russia's "Ivan the Terrible" who heckles German broadcasters becoming a welcome diversion to British broadcasting. The wavering intensity of the voice often gave a similar quality voice of Donald Duck which led some listeners to name him "Von Donald." Later, the heckler began interspersing comments between British news bulletins from the BBC. Some of the hecklings include the voice telling listeners to wait for the following day in the headline on the Germans keeping up their pressure on Ukraine, and the voice saying that a big offensive swept over Northern France has been shot down.

The Federal Bureau of Investigation made major headlines on November 24, 1943 after reporting a 90-second interruption of a Nazi man speaking rapidly over a CBS Radio program on WOKO-AM in Albany, New York. The FBI later stated that the interruption was reported as a mistake in telephone transmission "or possibly from an enemy broadcast" and reported that there is no "direct allegation" of the latter.

On two occasions in 1983, one on May 27 and another in early July, WUWU minority shareholder Bob Allen hijacked his own station in a feud with majority owner Ron Chmiel, who had fired him for multiple reasons. Allen was acquitted on predural grounds.

In April 2016, multiple radio stations in the United States were hacked in order to broadcast an explicit podcast about the furry fandom. The hackers targeted individual Barix audio streaming devices that were findable on the search engine Shodan, logged into them, and locked out the owners while airing the podcast.

On November 10, 2017, intruders broadcast ISIS propaganda for 30 minutes on the Malmö station of Swedish radio network Mix Megapol. A spokesperson for Bauer Media Group, Mix Megapol's owners, stated that "somebody interfered with our frequency using a pirate transmitter" and that they would contact the Swedish Post and Telecom Authority.

During the 2020 United States presidential election, the radio station WWEI in Springfield, Massachusetts, was jammed by a pirate radio station in the vicinity of downtown Warren. Witnesses reported hearing fading static and a looping recording of a voice that whispered, "Don't be a chump, vote for Trump."

The community radio station Horizon Radio, serving the Milton Keynes area in England, had its DAB broadcast hijacked for almost half an hour on the evening of 9 October 2025. During this time, listeners heard the word fuck spoken continuously. The hijack was noticed by the station's managing director as he was driving home. A contractual dispute involving the provider responsible for the web audio stream connecting the station's studios to the transmitter was blamed.

On November 23, 2025, during the broadcast of an NFL game, Houston radio station KFNC was hijacked by an unidentified individual that played the song "Nigger Hatin' Me" by 1960s-era white supremacist country singer Johnny Rebel, Emergency Alert System tones, and liners promoting social media accounts of an online furry artist called GrimPlaysStuff. Similar incidents also happened on multiple local radio stations across the US states and other countries. GrimPlaysStuff would end up deleting most of his social media accounts the same day, with this incident being directly cited as the reason. His social media accounts would later be reinstated, though they would be deleted once again following future incidents. According to GrimPlaysStuff in a now deleted YouTube video responding to the hijacking incidents involving his name, he had nothing to do with this or the June 1st, 2026 hijaking of Jak TV.

== See also ==
- Pirate radio
- Pirate television
- Culture jamming
- Radio jamming
- Zoombombing
