= Channel Zero =

Channel Zero can refer to:

- Channel Zero (video encoding), a multi-camera, split-screen encoding method
- Channel Zero (company), a Toronto-based broadcasting company
- Channel Zero (band), a Belgian heavy metal band
- Channel Zero (comics), a comic book by Brian Wood
- Channel Zero (TV series), a horror anthology television series
- "She Watch Channel Zero?!", a song by the band Public Enemy
- Kanał Zero (Polish for Channel Zero), Polish general-interest YouTube channel and satellite channel
- Canal Zero, a defunct Portuguese pirate television station

Channel 0 can refer to:

- ATV (Australia), a Melbourne television station previously known as "ATV-0"
- TVQ, a Brisbane television station previously known as "TVQ-0"
- RTQ, a Toowoomba television station previously known as "DDQ-0"
- Special Broadcasting Service, an Australian public broadcasting radio and television network previously known as "Channel 0/28"
