= 1981 in Irish television =

The following is a list of events relating to television in Ireland from 1981.

== Events ==
- April – The Working Party on Women in Broadcasting presents its report to the RTÉ Authority.
- 4 April – Ireland hosts the Eurovision Song Contest from the RDS Simmonscourt Pavilion, Dublin, after winning the previous year. The contest is won by the United Kingdom with the song "Making Your Mind Up", performed by the group Bucks Fizz, while the Irish entry, "Horoscopes" by the trio Sheeba ends in fifth place.
- 25 April – Launch date of Channel D, a pirate television station in Dublin.
- 17 June – RTÉ broadcast seventeen continuous hours of coverage of the 1981 General Election.
- 30 June – Patrick Cooney is appointed Minister for Posts and Telegraphs.
- 11 November – RTÉ Television begins airing the Irish language adult education programme Anois 's Arís.
- Undated – RTÉ is given special government permission to broadcast two television programmes that are part of a series jointly produced with the BBC titled The Troubles. The programmes include interviews with organisations banned from the media by Section 31 of the Broadcasting Authority Act.

== Debuts ==
=== RTÉ 1 ===
- 14 January – (United Kingdom) Brendon Chase (1980)
- 20 March – (United States) Dennis the Menace (1959–1963)
- 7 October – (United States) 3-2-1 Contact (1980–1988)

=== RTÉ 2 ===
- 15 May – (United States) Palmerstown, U.S.A. (1980–1981)

== Ongoing television programmes ==
=== 1960s ===
- RTÉ News: Nine O'Clock (1961–present)
- RTÉ News: Six One (1962–present)
- The Late Late Show (1962–present)
- Wanderly Wagon (1967–1982)

=== 1970s ===
- Sports Stadium (1973–1997)
- Trom agus Éadrom (1975–1985)
- The Late Late Toy Show (1975–present)
- RTÉ News on Two (1978–2014)
- The Live Mike (1979–1982)
- Bosco (1979–1996)
- The Sunday Game (1979–present)

=== 1980s ===
- Bracken (1980–1982)

== Ending this year ==
- Undated – Quicksilver (1965–1981)

== Births ==
- 26 January – Colin O'Donoghue, film, television and theatre actor
- 8 March – Glenda Gilson, model and television presenter

== See also ==
- 1981 in Ireland
