= 1990 in Brazilian television =

This is a list of Brazilian television related events from 1990.

== Events ==
- 5 February – The children's program Rá-Tim-Bum premieres on TV Cultura.
- 27 March – The first version of the telenovela Pantanal, which is written by Benedito Ruy Barbosa, premieres on Rede Manchete.
- 29 March – The investigative journalism program Linha Direta premieres on TV Globo.
- 2 April – The first episode of the telenovela Rainha da Sucata airs on TV Globo.
- 26 April – TV Globo marks 25 years on the air.
- 27 May – The miniseries Desejo premieres on TV Globo.
- 24 June – The miniseries A, e, i, o… Urca premieres on TV Globo.

== Television shows ==
=== 1970s ===
- Turma da Mônica (1976–present)

=== 1980s ===
- Xou da Xuxa (1986-1992)

== Networks and services ==
=== Launches ===
Network	Type	Launch date	Notes	Source
TV Jovem Pan	Terrestrial	Unknown		
3 Antena	Terrestrial (illegal)	6 May		

=== Conversions and rebrandings ===
Old network name	New network name	Type	Conversion Date	Notes	Source
TV Abril	MTV Brasil	Terrestrial	20 October	First version, shut down on 30 September 2013, in theory replaced by a new feed created by Viacom for subscription television,	

=== Closures ===
Network	Type	Closure date	Notes	Source
3 Antena	Cable television	29 August		

== See also ==
- 1990 in Brazil
