= TV Cidade Berço =

Portuguese pirate television station

- Country: Portugal
- Broadcast area: Lisbon metropolitan area
- Headquarters: Loures or Odivelas

Programming
- Language: Portuguese
- Picture format: 576i (4:3 SDTV)

Ownership
- Owner: TV Cidade Berço

History
- Launched: 1989; 37 years ago
- Closed: 1990; 36 years ago

Availability

Terrestrial
- UHF analog: Unknown

TV Cidade Berço was a pirate television station in Guimarães, active in 1989–1990. The station aired local programming, usually once a week, as well as having coverage of local events.

== History ==
The city was previously served by other stations, first by Televisão de Covas (or TV Covas) until July 1986 (shut down due to a complaint from RTP, and later by Televisão Regional de Guimarães. It continued operating after three stations (Rádio e Televisão da Amadora, Televisão Regional da Amadora and Canal Zero) in greater Lisbon were shut down on 23 July 1987 by the authorities.

It was reported that the station was operational in early 1989, operating only on Friday nights and reportedly attracting success from locals, much like other television stations that operated in a similar condition. The latest known contemporary information regarding TV Cidade Berço was from the Saint Nicholas dancing ceremony on 5 December 1990, in which the station was a sponsor, alongside the legalized local radio stations Rádio Fundação and Rádio Santiago. It is unknown if TV Cidade Berço did further broadcasts after that date or when did it shut down.
