= Channel D =

Channel D may refer to:

- Kanal D, a Turkish TV channel
- Canal D, a French Canadian TV channel
- Channel D (Irish TV channel)
