= Televisão de Abrantes =

- Country: Portugal
- Broadcast area: Abrantes
- Headquarters: Abrantes

Programming
- Language: Portuguese
- Picture format: 576i (4:3 SDTV)

Ownership
- Owner: António Colaço

History
- Launched: October 17, 1986; 39 years ago
- Closed: Unknown

Availability

Terrestrial
- UHF analog: Channel 32

Televisão de Abrantes (abbreviated TVA) was a pirate television station broadcasting from Abrantes. It started broadcasting in 1986 and shut down ad an unknown date.

== History ==
TVA appeared at a time when pressure was being made to legalize local radio stations, which operated illegally. António Colaço was its founder and acted as its main news presenter. Its first broadcast was on 17 October 1986, the first program produced being a debate on a thermoelectrical power plant.

TVA produced a lot of local programs, most of which led by Colaço himself, which was unlike what happened on the station in Loures which stole TV programs and movies. Colaço thought that the programs he made for TVA were of a high quality. There is no concrete information as to when did the station shut down, other than the fact that its equipment was seized by the authorities. António Colaço was subject to a two-to-eight year prison term for being accused of managing a pirate television station; other names such as Vasco Lourenço, Mário Viegas and Constância mayor António Mendes were also involved. The case was taken to the courts, but Colaço did not provide evidence. He was later involved in a later pilot project, Mangualde 2000, in 1997.
