= Pirate television =

Broadcast TV station operating without a license

A pirate television station is a broadcast television station that operates without a valid broadcast license. Like its counterpart pirate radio, the term pirate TV lacks a specific universal interpretation. It implies a form of broadcasting that is unwelcome by the licensing authorities within the territory where its signals are received, especially when the country of transmission is the same as the country of reception. When the area of transmission is not a country, or when it is a country and the transmissions are not illegal, those same broadcast signals may be deemed illegal in the country of reception. Pirate television stations may also be known as "bootleg TV", or confused with licensed low-power broadcasting (LPTV) or amateur television (ATV) services.

== History ==
The first known pirate TV station in the US was Lanesville TV, active between 1972-1977 and operated by the counter-cultural video collective the Videofreex from Lanesville, New York. Another documented pirate TV station in the 1970s was Lucky 7, which broadcast for a single weekend in April 1978 from Syracuse, New York.

There was a wildly active scene in the Netherlands between the late 1970s and the early 1980s. Some broadcast on UHF while others on cable after the nightly closedown of the official channels.

== Techniques ==
There are several techniques for pirate TV broadcasting, most of which have been made very difficult, or obsolete, by better security measures and the move to digital television.

=== Relay hijack (analogue) ===
Many analogue relay transmitters would "listen" to a more powerful main transmitter and relay the signal verbatim. If the main transmitter ceases broadcasting (for example, if a station closes down overnight) then a pirate signal on the same frequency as the main transmitter could cause the relay to "wake up" and relay unauthorized programming instead. Typically this would be done by outputting a very weak RF signal within the immediate vicinity of the relay: for example, a video cassette recorder (such as a 12v system designed for use in trucks) sending its signal to a home-made antenna pointed at the relay. As the pirate signal is relatively weak, the source can be difficult to locate if it is well hidden.

A significant benefit of this attack is that the potential viewers do not have to re-tune their televisions to view the content; the content simply appears on an existing channel, after close-down.

This attack is generally now prevented by the channels broadcasting 24 hours per day (e.g. showing test cards instead of closing down), by using satellite feeds instead of repeating terrestrial signals, by electronic security to lock the relay to the authorised source, or by the switch to digital television.

Unsecured analogue satellite transponders have also been reported to have been hijacked in a similar manner.

=== Source hijack (analogue or digital) ===
In this scenario, a man-in-the-middle attack is performed upon the source material, such that authorized official transmissions are fed with unauthorized programming from the central studio or play-out facility. For example, a link feed (e.g. outside broadcast) is hijacked by a stronger pirate signal, or pre-recorded media (such as videotapes or hard drives) are swapped over for unauthorised content. This attack would generally have to be performed by an insider or by gaining access to studio facilities by social engineering.

=== Unauthorized transmitter (analogue) ===
As with most pirate radio stations, reasonably powerful VHF/UHF transmitters can be built relatively easily by any sufficiently experienced electronics hobbyist, or imported from a less strict country. The primary challenge to this technique is finding a suitable yet inconspicuous vantage point for the transmission antenna, and the risk of getting caught. If the pirate signal is strong enough to be received directly, it will also be strong enough to be tracked down.

=== Unauthorized multiplex (digital) ===
The advent of digital television makes pirate television broadcasting more difficult. Channels are broadcast as part of a multiplex that carries several channels in one signal, and it is almost impossible to insert an unauthorized channel into an authorized multiplex, or to re-activate an off-air channel. In order to broadcast an unauthorized digital TV channel, not only must the perpetrator build or obtain a VHF/UHF transmitter, they must also build or obtain, and configure, the equipment and software to digitally encode the signal and then create a stand-alone multiplex to carry it.

In Spain, major provincial capital cities usually have one or more pirate TV digital multiplexes in operation. Some multiplexes started to operate after digital switch-over, migrating pirate channels from analogue pirate television to DVB-T digital multiplexes.

Since shortly after digital switch-over and still today in secondary cities, some channels broadcast by means of a DVB-T transmitter with four analog input sources (in this case, four tuned satellite receivers connected by composite video cable) and then to an amplifier; the digital signal is fed to an antenna or tower. This method is the one most commonly used by most pirate TV channels. However, over the years and due to economic returns, some have begun broadcasting almost professionally. New equipment that stations have installed since the 2010s allows remultiplexing of DVB-S programs into DVB-T multiplexes and most parameters can be configured at will.

Since 2010, pirate stations have been increasing in number in Madrid and in Valencia, for example. As of March 2016, there are more than ten DVB-T pirate multiplexes in the Madrid metropolitan area transmitting without authorization, with programming ranging from divinatory, esoteric and occult tarot or fundamentalist Christian to community television (which isn't regulated in Spain as of 2016).

In other countries, there are reports of pirate TV digital multiplexes, but they are very rare and usually suspected to have been false reports, mistaking overspill from authorized multiplexes in neighboring regions or nearby foreign countries. Viewing numbers may be much smaller than analogue pirate TV since re-tuning a digital television may be an entirely automated process which may ignore unauthorized multiplexes, or place such channels in an obscure section of the electronic program guide.

== Stations ==
=== Known stations ===
- 3 Antena - Rio de Janeiro, June to August 1990.
- beoutQ - Saudi Arabia. Started broadcasting after Qatar-based channels, such as beIN Sports, were banned following the Qatar diplomatic crisis. Primarily airs sports programs.
- Cab TV - Cabanatuan, Nueva Ecija, Philippines - In 2012, DWJJ-AM was simulcast via analog channel 16 under the Kaissar Broadcasting Network. In 2016, the National Telecommunications Commission brought a case against illegal TV broadcasts.
- Canal Zero - Loures, January to July 1987, successor of Televisão Regional de Loures
- Channel D - Dublin, Ireland (c. 1981)
- iStreetTV! - Palmers Cross, Jamaica, a project of !Mediengruppe Bitnik (2008)
- Kanal X - Leipzig, Germany. Operated during the final days of the German Democratic Republic (East Germany).
- Lanesville TV - Lanesville, New York, United States. Operated on VHF channel 3 by the video collective Videofreex and broadcast on Saturdays from 1972 to 1977 (a total of 258 broadcasts). The collective and its station is detailed in Parry D. Teasdale's book Videofreex: America's First Pirate TV Station & the Catskills Collective That Turned It On.
- Lucky 7 - Syracuse, New York, United States. Operated during the evenings of April 14–16, 1978 on VHF channel 7
- Nederland 3 - Leiden, Netherlands, 1980–1981
- NeTWork 21 - London, England - Broadcast for around 30 minutes on Friday evenings in 1986
- New Stations Broadcasting Network - New York City, New York, United States. Intermittent series of broadcasts in Brooklyn, New York beginning in 2007 created by artist James Case Leal. In New York operates on UHF channel 17, but is also responsible for television programming in other cities including Havana, Cuba (April 20, 2009 - May 22, 2009 Ch. 16), Minneapolis, Minnesota during the RNC 2008 (Ch. 15), and Piedras Negras, Mexico (July 2008 Ch. 23).
- Northern Access Network - Canada, various locations in the late 1970s
- Nova TV - Dublin, Ireland (c. 1985)
- Odelia TV - Operated briefly in 1981 on UHF channel 58, offshore of Israel.
- Pirate TV - From around 2002-2009 (Note: Earliest known footage is speculated to be from the 1990's, but the clip of Brian Olson is from at least 2002, as he wasn't part of DISH until then. Olsen left in 2008.), users of piracy boxes that received Dish Network illegitimately received a channel that was only visible to, as the Network called it, "satellite pirates". These stations played a looping video, typically telling the viewer that only viewers without proper authorization can view this station and— by viewing said station— they are a satellite pirate, and therefore in violation of Federal law. A variety of different videos were used, some surviving renditions of these mention that the device they possess is being tracked by various federal intelligence agencies and hardware manufacturers, with others listing channels that the viewer should notice they no longer have access to (with "new electronic countermeasures" to be implemented to secure further channels). All versions claimed the viewer might not know that they are an illegitimate customer; viewers of these stations were instructed to call the standard DISH support line to be set up with a Dish Network Subscription legitimately.
- Satanische Omroep Stichting - Amsterdam, 1981
- Second City Vision - Birmingham, 1983, operated on the local BBC2 transmitter after closedown
- Star Ray TV - Broadcasting on UHF channel 15 in the Beaches neighborhood of Toronto, Ontario, Canada
- Telstar TV (c. 1984) Birmingham, United Kingdom. Broadcast for about eight weeks on the BBC2 transmitter in the Northfield and Rubery areas of Birmingham. Showed a mixture of films and pop videos after BBC2 closed at weekends and went unnoticed by the authorities for several weeks, much to their embarrassment.
- Telecanal - Chile. On June 16, 2025, Telecanal abruptly began retransmitting the Russian state-funded channel RT en Español for nearly 24 hours a day, replacing its previous mix of packaged content and infomercials. This change was enabled by a commercial agreement signed on June 13, 2025, with Unimedios Publicidad México, which allowed the broadcast of RT programming for up to 23.5 hours daily. The station retained only minimal local obligations, such as mandatory cultural content required by Chile’s National Television Council (CNTV), along with occasional interruptions for national events, elections, or emergencies. While the arrangement technically preserved Telecanal’s editorial control, in practice the channel functioned largely as a relay for RT’s signal across both terrestrial digital frequencies and pay-TV operators. The retransmission triggered strong reactions from political figures, civil society, and other broadcasters. Right-wing parties criticized RT as Kremlin propaganda and a threat to democratic pluralism, while human rights organizations raised concerns about biased coverage of international conflicts. Canal 13 filed a formal complaint with the CNTV, accusing Telecanal of illegally ceding control of its signal. The CNTV subsequently initiated sanction procedures, citing violations of Article 16 of the Television Law, which prohibits the transfer of editorial responsibility to third parties. Multiple fines were issued, a seven-day suspension was ordered in early 2026, and further proceedings were launched after Telecanal initially failed to comply. Despite legal appeals and a temporary return to its previous format in late April 2026, the station continued to face mounting regulatory pressure due to both the RT agreement and long-standing technical non-compliance with coverage obligations. On May 4, 2026, the CNTV unanimously declared the total expiry of Canal Dos S.A.’s digital broadcasting concessions, citing repeated and serious breaches of technical, administrative, and legal requirements. As a result, since May 12, 2026, Telecanal had operated for 24 hours as a pirate television station without a valid broadcasting license. Although the channel briefly resumed its traditional infomercial-heavy programming after a short suspension, the revocation means it no longer holds legal authorization to use the assigned frequencies. The frequencies are now subject to a new public tender process, as the spectrum is considered a public good that must be managed efficiently in the public interest. The channel closed on May 14, 2026.
- Telestreet - Italy - Movement that set up pirate TV micro-stations; was legal since its launch in 2005
- Televisão Amadora de Pernes - Pernes, Santarém, early 1980s
- Televisão Castanheirense - Castanheira de Pera, 1987 and 1988
- Televisão de Abrantes - Abrantes, 1986 (unknown closing date)
- Televisão de Espinho - Espinho, 1987-1988, better known as "Canal 22" owing to its frequency
- Televisão do Nordeste (TVN) - Bragança, February 12, 1990
- Televisão Regional de Loures (TRL) - Odivelas and Loures, Portugal. Station was founded circa 1985, by two radio enthusiasts who transmitted signals between their homes using an improvised transmitter. They broadcast their first movie in January 1986, with regular broadcasts starting in March of that year. TRL was known for interviewing celebrities, as well as local news, weather reports, and the like. Unlike most pirate TV stations, TRL was known to show commercials during its programming. It was claimed that the station reached approximately 250,000 viewers. The station also broadcast adult movies in its early stages, though these were eventually removed from its programming. At one point, RTP and others took TRL to court, though the case ended up being shelved. TRL eventually closed for good, and its equipment was seized by the Portuguese authorities.
- Televisão Regional do Norte (TVN) - Porto, November 15, 1985
- Televisão Regional Portuguesa (TRP) - Lisbon, April 25, 1995, debate on the possibility of establishing a legal framework for regional and local TV in Portugal, much like what happened with local radio several years before
- Televisie Vrij Apeldoorn - Apeldoorn 1981-1982
- Thameside TV - London, England - A very early pirate TV station set up by Thameside Radio. There were only two known broadcasts in December 1984.
- TV Cidade Berço - Guimarães, 1989-1990
- TV Cubo - São Paulo, 1986 - 1990
- TV Maravilha - A TV station in Porto that made its only test broadcast in February 1984.
- TV Noordzee - A 1964 TV station on VHF channel 11 which, along with Radio Noordzee (not to be confused with the later Radio North Sea International), broadcast from "REM Island", an artificial platform 6 miles offshore of Noordwijk in the Netherlands. Both of the stations were knocked off the air by a sea and air raid by the armed forces of the Netherlands.
- TV Randers Syd - Randers, Denmark. Operated during 1981 and 1982. It was mostly broadcasting TV shows with music and entertainment recorded from German and Swedish TV channels and American movies. After two years of broadcasting the pirate was found in the suburb of Vorup and the station was closed by the authorities.
- TV Syd - A short-lived offshore TV station that broadcast on UHF channel 41. It was the sister station of Radio Syd and broadcast from the MV Cheeta 2 anchored off the Swedish coast.
- Utopía TV - Buenos Aires, 1992 to 1999
- Voice of Nuclear Disarmament - Operating in the 1960s and technically a radio station, it broadcast pre-recorded programs from high-rise rooftops in the Greater London area on the audio portion of BBC1's television frequency after the station signed off for the night. Programming consisted of interviews, announcements, folk songs, and field recordings.
- W6JDI-TV - Amateur television station in the San Francisco area, started broadcasting weeks before KPIX
- WGUN - Mentioned in an article by Shannon Huniwell in Popular Communications magazine, this was a short-lived pirate station in the Lynchburg, Virginia area that broadcast on channel 45 during the late 1970s. The sole broadcast consisted of a water pistol with "WGUN 45 TV" in cut out letters mounted on a phonograph turntable with audio from "an unmercifully scratchy Baja Marimba Band album". The station was located by radio station technicians after being informed by the mother of a young viewer who found the station while tuning the UHF TV band. When asked, the young unnamed pirate stated he purchased the transmitter, an EMC Model TXRU-100 UHF transmitter, at a rummage sale from a church that had intended to start a UHF-TV station. Upon being informed that his broadcasts were illegal, the station was shut down. The transmitter was reportedly re-sold at a yard sale.
- W10BM - Morehead, Kentucky, United States - Originally a licensed LPTV station on VHF channel 10, it operated from 2004 to 2019 on a canceled license, making it a pirate broadcaster.
- Za Zhizn! - Russian channel hijacking Ukrainian channels on satellites in 2024.

During the 1980s, large numbers of pirate TV stations operated in Italy, Greece, Spain and Israel. Subsequent legislation led to the licensing of many of these stations and the closure of (most of) the remainder.

=== Proposed stations ===
- Caroline TV - Advertised in 1970, this was to have been a project related to Radio Caroline, which at the time was off the air. Artwork showing the proposed station's identification graphics were released, but the station, which was to be broadcast from an airplane (similar to Stratovision), never materialized, although there are two website domains, called www.carolinetv.co.uk. And carolinetelevision.com
- City TV - Was to have broadcast from a decommissioned minesweeper offshore of England. Plans for the station were announced on 8 June 1965, and was to have broadcast on VHF channel 3, but the station never materialized. It is not to be confused with the later CityTV in Toronto and Vancouver, Canada, which began operation in 1972 and are fully licensed and legal full-power stations.
- Sealand Television - Was to have broadcast on Channel 28 from the Principality of Sealand, a micronation established on a World War Two gunnery platform off the coast of Essex, England. The station, which was announced to start in September 1987, was to have been financed by Wallace Kemper, who was facing fraud and conspiracy charges.
- Tower TV - Was to have broadcast from Sunk Head Fort, 14 miles offshore of Essex, England. Reportedly held a test transmission at 4:20 AM on Tuesday 9 November 1965. If this station had gone on air it would have probably caused interference with a legitimate transmitter at Peterborough on the same frequency.

== See also ==
- Broadcast signal intrusion—the intentional "hacking" into a licensed facility for broadcasting pirate television
