= Nederland 3 (pirate TV station) =

Nederland 3 - Vrije Televisie
- Country: Netherlands
- Broadcast area: Randstad
- Headquarters: Leiden

Programming
- Language: English
- Picture format: 576i (4:3 SDTV)

History
- Launched: October 6, 1980; 45 years ago
- Closed: 1981; 45 years ago

Nederland 3 was a pirate television station in Leiden in the Netherlands. The station predates the actual Nederland 3 by eight years (and was unrelated to the later channel).

== History ==
A group of radio amateurs in the Randstad area made the first broadcast of Nederland 3 late at night on 6 October 1980. The station broadcast on the cable frequencies of German channel ZDF after the end of ZDF's broadcast day. Unlike PTV, another notable pirate television station, it broadcast local programmes instead of pornography. A staff member known as "Hans from Nederland 3" said that it had nothing to do with the former PTV, yet its inaugural broadcast was an "ode" to PTV. The name Nederland 3 was selected out of dissatisfaction with the Dutch public broadcasting system, at a time when there were only two legal television channels (Nederland 1 and Nederland 2). Using the name Nederland 3 reiterated the position against the television monopoly in the Netherlands and demanded the creation of more competition.

Still in its first week on air, Nederland 3 issued a statement to the press that the channel was akin to a traveling circus, broadcasting its signal in itineration across the several cable companies at the short-term. On 8 October, Veronica profiled the station. The station closed at the end of 1981.
