= Televisão Regional Portuguesa =

- Country: Portugal
- Broadcast area: Lisbon
- Headquarters: Lisbon

Programming
- Language: Portuguese
- Picture format: 576i (4:3 SDTV)

Ownership
- Owner: Movimento da Legalização das Televisões Regionais

History
- Launched: 25 April 1995; 31 years ago
- Closed: 25 April 1995; 31 years ago

Televisão Regional Portuguesa (TRP) was a one-time pirate television station and the key figure of Movimento para a Legalização das Televisões Regionais. The station made its sole broadcast on the night of 24–25 April 1995 (coinciding with the 21st anniversary of the 25 April coup that reinstated freedom) and had, as its goal, questioning the ruling PSD government and legalizing regional stations.

== The broadcast ==
TRP's sole broadcast took place on the early hours of 25 April 1995. The goal was to convince the government to set up a network of local television stations, considering that local radio stations were legalized and already had an operational framework. Its studios were located at Campo de Ourique, The broadcast also featured the participation of poet Mário Viegas, however, it was the target of an investigation from Polícia Judiciária.

== Aftermath ==
Following the broadcast, the topic entered public opinion and several local and regional television station projects appeared, willing to broadcast even illegally, still to pressure the government. The movement was ultimately dissolved in February 1997, nearly two years after founding, having held a debate on the subject that month; a later debate in December was held without its participation, in the context of the then-upcoming regionalization referendum.
