= Lucky 7 (pirate TV station) =

Pirate television station in Syracuse, New York

- Syracuse, New York; United States
- Channels: Analog: 7 (VHF)
- Branding: Lucky 7

History
- First air date: April 14, 1978
- Last air date: April 16, 1978

Lucky 7 was a pirate television station, believed to be one of the first ever to operate in the United States, that aired for three nights in the spring of 1978 in Syracuse, New York.

== Operation ==
Lucky 7 (operated by the "Renegade Broadcasting Company") aired for a total of 25 hours during the evenings of April 14–16, 1978 on VHF channel 7, an otherwise-unoccupied frequency in the Syracuse area.

Programs aired by Lucky 7 included episodes of such TV series as Star Trek and The Twilight Zone, as well as several films unavailable on broadcast television at the time. These included films such as One Flew Over the Cuckoo's Nest (1975), Rocky (1976), and Annie Hall (1977), plus pornographic fare such as Deep Throat (1972) and The Devil in Miss Jones (1973).

According to reports by the Associated Press and The New York Times, a man with a gas mask and a noose around his neck was seen onscreen occasionally, editorializing and claiming that half the TVs in the Syracuse area were able to see the broadcasts. Station identification featured a pair of dice rolled to seven, backed by female singers (reportedly from Syracuse University's Crouse Music School).

== Aftermath ==
At the time of broadcast, a Federal Communications Commission engineer theorized that the broadcasters tapped into Home Box Office and other networks to acquire programming, and that the transmissions probably originated from the area surrounding Syracuse University because Lucky 7 came in strongest near the campus. Subsequent speculation is that Lucky 7 was the brainchild of students from the Newhouse School of Communications with the assistance of nearby SUNY Morrisville journalism program students, who used equipment normally available for closed circuit broadcasts on channel 7 on the University's cable system, and transmitted the over-air signal using a standard VHF reception antenna.

A contemporary article in The Daily Orange, the Syracuse University student newspaper, reported that Lucky 7 accomplished the broadcasts by "attaching an RF modulator to a videotape recorder and intensifying the [...] signal with an old guitar amplifier". The report also noted that the transmissions "reportedly came from the Thornden Park area", and that "anywhere from two to 25 people were involved in the project". The article quoted one of the programmers as saying they were going "way underground", adding "It started as an experiment. It backfired enormously [...] We got nervous when we saw it was making a big splash."
