= Thameside TV =

- Country: United Kingdom
- Broadcast area: London
- Headquarters: London

Programming
- Language: English
- Picture format: PAL 576i

Ownership
- Owner: Thameside Radio

History
- Launched: 7 October 1984; 41 years ago
- Closed: 4 January 1985; 41 years ago

Availability

Terrestrial
- UHF (Crystal Palace): Channel 28

Thameside TV was the first pirate television station in London. Operating in the last quarter of 1984, the station broadcast on at least two UHF frequencies before being shut down. The station was owned by the also-illegal Thameside Radio.

== History ==
In 1984, the United Kingdom had four television channels available: BBC1, BBC2, ITV and Channel 4. The first broadcast made by Thameside TV was done on 7 October 1984 by repeating the same programme for two hours over a one-week period. The station used the Crystal Palace transmitting station to deliver its signal on UHF channel 28 and was relayed on 90.5 on the FM band. Its inaugural programme consisted of music videos and the Yellow Submarine film. 24 hours after that, a competing station made broadcasts over channel 36. The initial broadcast was seen with "fuzzy" reception, per a Daily Mail article two days after starting. Like its competitor on channel 36, it planned to broadcast music videos and feature films. Bob Edwards demanded the creation of more channels due to the supposed "boredom" of the existing networks available at the time. The next programme was a Christmas special, which is considered lost because the station was closed by the Department of Trade and Industry.

Its final broadcast was made on 4 January 1985 consisting of more music videos, this time reducing the looping to a six-hour period from 6pm to midnight. A further broadcast was scheduled to be made in February, but the station was raided before music videos were added to the pre-recorded continuity links from VJ Bob.
