= Utopía TV =

Defunct Argentine pirate television station

- Country: Argentina
- Broadcast area: Buenos Aires
- Headquarters: Buenos Aires

Programming
- Language: Spanish
- Picture format: 576i (4:3 SDTV)

Ownership
- Owner: Fabián Moyano

History
- Launched: June 1992; 33 years ago
- Closed: 1999; 27 years ago

Availability

Terrestrial
- VHF analog: Channel 4 (later moved to channel 6)

Utopía TV, also simply known as Canal 4 Utopía was a pirate television station in Buenos Aires, Argentina, that operated between 1992 and 1999 on VHF channel 4.

== History ==
When Ricardo Leguizamón was studying engineering in 1983, he had the dream of seeing community radio and TV stations appear in Argentina, using low-power transmitters. Thanks to a contact with a Polish engineer, he started developing the technical infrastructure. In June 1992, Utopía went live on channel 4, owned by Alejandro Korn. At the time there were 250 stations taking part of Asociación Argentina de Teledifusoras Comunitarias (AATECO).

Fabián Moyano, founder of Canal 4 Utopía, had prior experience with pirate television stations when he set up Canal 4 Ciudadela in 1989, broadcasting movies and a local news service on weekends. Moyano had taken part in the TV Viva project in Brazil and wanted to emulate it in Argentina. The creators of the channel separated in 1992 and Moyano moved from Fuerte Apache to Caballito, where he named the new channel Utopía (after the song by Joan Manuel Serrat). The transmitter was expropriated from one in Catamarca Province, which was used by Ramón Saadi to promote his political campaign; however, due to a technical failure, the transmitter was bought to Buenos Aires, the capital of Argentina. The relocation to Caballito was seen as strategic according to Moyano, due to the events and its central location, which enabled coverage across Buenos Aires.

Programming started at 6am with a list of jobs available, followed by a newscast at 7am. At 8:30am, a cartoon block with content recorded off cable channels started, fronted by a 10-year old child, who also received live phone calls without any type of filter. At 12pm the channel aired a long block of movies and music videos, followed by the main news at 9pm, covering what the private channels (2, 9, 11, 13) didn't cover. At midnight the channel aired a call-in segment where the viewers selected what would be the three movies to air overnight. Film specialists provided themed cycles. On Mondays, the channel aired Bodega erótica, and on another day of the week, El intestino verde, hosted by a 14-year old boy, airing horror movies.

The facilities were raided on June 23, 1994 following complaints from Cablevisión, which by then the station had moved to channel 6, operating with emergency equipment donated from viewers.

A search and seizure operation in 1999 led to the permanent shutdown of its operations. After the passing of a new media law in 2009, community stations had their broadcasts approved again. In 2011, producer Quijotesco Deus directed a documentary on the channel (which he was a part of).
