= TV Syd (Swedish television channel) =

- Country: Sweden
- Broadcast area: Øresund

Programming
- Language: Swedish
- Picture format: PAL 576i

Ownership
- Owner: Radio Syd

History
- Launched: 19 December 1965; 60 years ago
- Closed: 18 January 1966; 60 years ago

Availability

Terrestrial
- UHF: Channel 41

TV Syd was a short-lived Swedish pirate television station operated by Radio Syd, a pirate radio station operating from the ship Cheeta II. The station made experimental broadcasts for a few weeks in December 1965 and January 1966 but never started definitive operations. It also had a continuity studio aboard the ship.

== History ==
Throughout 1965, Radio Syd started plans for the upcoming TV Syd. Test transmissions started on 13 December 1965, at the same time as Britt Wadner was sentenced to three months in prison for being the owner of Radio Syd. The first broadcast was on 19 December 1965, with a live radio and TV simulcast of Söndagsposten from Radio Syd. The station was financed by commercial advertising, at a time when the only channel available was, then as now, devoid of carrying advertisements. The main advertisers were the Hertz car rental chain and EL BO Radio, a department store.

On 24 December (Christmas Eve) the channel aired Julens P2, a Christmas special that was also a radio-TV simulcast with Radio Syd, with gifts given to viewers and listeners, as well as features such as the German film Kaspers Reise um die Welt (1950) and Charlie Chaplin and Laurel and Hardy shorts. For 1 January 1966, a boxing match between Bosse Högberg and Bruno Visintin was promised, but never made it to air.

On 18 January 1966, about a month after it started broadcasting, a large pack of ice hit the Øresund strait causing the ship to suspend radio and TV operations until further notice. Cheeta II was relocated to Essex, with the aim of resuming once the winter ice melted, however the ship never returned to Sweden and the station never returned on air. There were plans for the ship to be reused to broadcast Radio Caroline's Caroline TV, which never went into fruition.
