= W6JDI-TV =

Defunct amateur TV station in San Francisco

The only program broadcast on W6JDI-TV, a still image of an unidentified woman nicknamed "Gwendolyn".

W6JDI-TV was an amateur television station operating without a license in San Francisco from 1948 to 1949.

The station was set up by Clarence Wolfe Jr. of Burlingame in early November 1948, weeks before the first official television station in the area (KPIX-TV), initiating its test broadcasts with a still photograph of a brunette woman (Gwendolyn), which, by mid-December, had only been picked up by three receivers. The paucity of television sets in the area led to lack of confirmation on the extent of the reach of its signals. Unable to use equipment, he resorted to $500 worth of radio equipment from World War II, with assistance from Leslie Seabold. At the time the field tests started, Clarence said "Do you see her?" to find a potential viewer receiving the signals. Months after the first test, the signal was received by Bob Melvin, who reported "very good reception". The station was carried on the 429MHz band used for ham radio.

By August 1949, Clarence Wolfe Jr. planned to introduce live programming on the station.

It is unknown when the station ceased transmission. By 1950 (when there were already three commercial television stations operating in San Francisco), a number of amateur television stations appeared in the area. In January 1992, the transmitter was still up, but none of the television equipment was operational. Clarence Wolfe, Jr. died on September 18, 2002 at the age of 89.
