= Satanische Omroep Stichting =

Dutch pirate television station

Satanische Omroep Stichting (SOS, "Satanic Broadcasting Foundation") was a Dutch pirate television station in Amsterdam that operated in 1981. The station was established by satanist Maarten Joost Lamers.

== History ==
Maarten Lamers established a Satanist church in 1971; ten years later, he established SOS. As a pirate station, it broadcast illegal pornographic films, which could be received with adapted television antennas, commonly known in those days as "porno antennas" due to their characteristics. The station caused the profits of adult video rental stores to fall. Lamers even went as far as a gathering at Hotel Caransa, which he led, among other pirate television owners of the time, but which ended in a fight. It is known that the airing of porn movies was due to the fact that Lamers owned a sex club.

The station was operational in August 1981, and shared the same address as Mokum TV, another pirate station. The station broadcast its services on Tuesdays and Thursdays after ARD's closedown. By 1 September, the Dutch government began plans to crack down on such stations, after a meeting of heads of the National Association of Free Television Stations (Landelijke vereniging voor vrije televisiezenders) was held three weeks earlier. It is unknown when the station closed, as most stations shut down around the time.

In 1984, the Dutch customs authority initiated a large-scale operation on Lamers' four buildings.
