= Thameside Radio =

Coordinates: 51.5237°N 0.2054°W

Thameside Radio was an unlicensed radio station based in London. It launched in the winter of 1977, offering "very slick pop rock with competitions", according to Time Out. According to the Richmond and Twickenham Times, it broadcast from "a certain Notting Hill tower block" – a reference to Trellick Tower.

The station received 30-40 letters each week and had an estimated listenership of around 20,000. It pioneered new music, and is noted by the New Musical Express for giving airplay to "Win a Night Out with a Well-Known Paranoiac" by Barry Andrews, which was subsequently picked up by BBC Radio 1.

Increasing numbers of raids resulted in the station losing five transmitters in six months and the station ceased live transmission, instead taping its shows shortly before broadcast.

Recordings of a number of Thameside Radio shows are held by the British Library. Many shows are available for download from fmthen.com and thamesideradio.org

In late 1984, Thameside set up the first London unlicensed TV station – Thameside TV – for a small number of broadcasts.

== See also ==
- Thameside Radio Revisited a downloadable archive of over 200 recordings of Thameside Radio shows
- Thameside Radio Home an archive of studio recordings
- The Thameside Radio Story for more information about the station
- The Intrepid Birdman's archives which include a section on Thameside Radio 90.2
- Surrey-sounds for more info on Thameside Radio and a clip from New Year 1979/1980
- Sample of the station's output
- The Intrepid Birdman on Mixcloud https://www.mixcloud.com/intrepidbirdman/
