= Televisão Regional do Norte =

- Country: Portugal
- Broadcast area: Porto
- Headquarters: Porto

Programming
- Language: Portuguese
- Picture format: 576i (4:3 SDTV)

Ownership
- Owner: Televisão Regional do Norte

History
- Launched: November 15, 1985; 40 years ago
- Closed: November 15, 1985; 40 years ago

Televisão Regional do Norte (TVN) was a one-time pirate television station that operated in Porto on the night of 15 November 1985. The 90-minute broadcast, with transmitter atop Jornal de Notícias' headquarters, was receivable in Porto and the coastal area. The broadcast interrupted RTP's signal.

== History ==
Fórum Portucalense was established in 1985 with the hope of establishing a local television station. On 15 November, the station held its only broadcast. It started with an announcement from António Vilar, president of the organization, and was followed by presenter Jacinta Oliveira. After footage of the Douro River, interviews to the mayors of Porto, Coimbra, Vila Real, Bragança, Viana do Castelo, Guarda, Viseu and Aveiro, as well as the archbishops of Braga, Bragança and Porto followed. The directors of Porto's three morning papers were also interviewed, which ended with a report on the manipulative capacities of television and ended with the Maria da Fonte anthem.

The broadcast received support from Proença de Carvalho, who told to the press that the people of the region should fight for the rights to have their own channel, instead of depending on Televisión de Galicia or "the government's humors" (referring to RTP).
