= Northern Access Network =

Short-lived Canadian TV network

- Type: Unlicensed television system
- Branding: NAN
- Country: Canada
- First air date: October 31, 1976
- Availability: See § Coverage
- Headquarters: NAN Studios, Pickle Lake, Ontario
- Broadcast area: Northern Ontario
- Owner: Northern Access Network
- Key people: David Brough
- Dissolved: 1981 (possibly)
- Affiliations: CTV, Global
- Language: English; French

Northern Access Network was a Canadian unlicensed television system which broadcast videotaped programming to remote Canadian communities in the late 1970s. Although short-lived and often in conflict with the Canadian Radio-television and Telecommunications Commission over its lack of a broadcast license, the service did have the effect of forcing Canada's major commercial television networks to add rebroadcast transmitters in a number of communities they had previously ignored.

The service's operator, David Brough, told The Globe and Mail in 1978 that his ultimate goal was to operate five transmitters in each community: two general entertainment channels to rebroadcast content from CTV and Global, a French channel to rebroadcast content from TVA (and Radio-Canada, where that service was not already available), an educational programming service and a local community channel. In actual practice, only one station was actually set up in each community, which aired either English-only or English and French programming depending on local market needs.

In the Globe interview, Brough clarified that his position was that he was simply using a different technological method to deliver a service legally and ethically no different from a cable television provider. The networks, however, viewed his methods as copyright infringement.

== History ==
Brough was a special education teacher at an institution for the mentally challenged and an entertainer for the Toronto-based Uncle Bobby children's TV series. In 1969 Brough travelled throughout remote northern Canada as a solo performer. During these tours he noted the lack of radio and television service in many regions and developed methods to bring television to remote Canadian communities. In 1971, Brough created a prototype television program in Yellowknife using portable videotape technology and demonstrated this to the CBC's board of directors. When the CBC rejected his proposals for extending television service, Brough then developed an inexpensive television system which could be installed in remote communities. The station depended on taped programming which would be shipped to the station, rather than on microwave or satellite transmissions. A camera was available at the station for local broadcasts. Brough installed the first Northern Access Network station at Pickle Lake, Ontario in December 1976 with support by Umex, the operator of a local mine. Operating costs of recording and shipping programming tapes were covered with subscriber fees through a locally-run trust fund.

The television channel was not licensed by the CRTC. When police attempted to confiscate the station's equipment, local miners and loggers defended the station by chopping down trees to block Highway 599. A Northern Access Network station was opened at Longlac, Ontario in 1977. French programming was included on that station to support the predominantly francophone community. Previously, only the CBC English network television service was available there. On 2 February 1978, the Longlac transmitter was seized by RCMP and Ontario Provincial Police officers accompanied by a representative from the federal Department of Communications.

In May 1977, the CRTC and the Department of Communications indicated that they would demonstrate some tolerance to the unlicensed Northern Access Network stations. They adopted an approach where further attempts at station closures were unlikely, particularly where television service was otherwise unavailable. Brough applied to the CRTC to formally license his stations. A hearing for that application was conducted that October. The CRTC awarded licences for five of his northern Ontario stations in late 1979, but rejected licences for many other existing stations. Brough's dilemma was that the smaller licensed stations would not be viable without income support from the unlicensed stations in more populous communities. Although it had been opposed to his original unlicensed methods, CTV did offer a network affiliation deal to Brough's licensed stations. The Northern Access Network grew from 30 stations in its first year to 50 by 1979. There were plans for up to 100 additional stations at that point. By 1981, Brough turned his attention to the development of satellite television receive-only systems. He began Commander Satellite Systems that year.

== Operations ==
A typical Northern Access Network station consisted of a tower with a low power transmitter. The programming signal originated from either a local video camera or a Betamax videocassette recorder. Brough recorded television programming in Toronto, primarily from the commercial networks CTV and Global, onto Betamax tapes which he then sent to the stations for broadcast. Tapes were sent out by mail, with the expectation that once broadcast, they would be sent on to the next station, similar to the "bicycling" method of broadcast syndication.

The initial Pickle Lake station featured a tower of 60 feet (18 m) supported by a one watt transmitter to provide an approximately 8 kilometres (5.0 mi) coverage area. Total equipment cost at Pickle Lake was approximately $4000.

Brough modified the Betamax cassette system so that it could contain 10 hours of programming which reduced shipping costs. In the late 1970s, each modified cassette cost Brough $30 compared to the $47 cost of each conventional Betamax cassette.

Stations were funded primarily through an expectation that viewers of the station would contribute toward an operational fund, although in many towns a large percentage of the viewership did not do so. A secondary source of operating funds for the stations was the broadcast of a televised bingo game, which viewers could play at home by buying bingo cards. Later, an inexpensive television encryption was developed for approximately $8 per descrambling unit. This allowed Northern Access Network to enforce a subscriber fee system in its communities.

== Coverage ==
The Northern Access Network operated low-power television stations serving approximately 30 remote communities in northern Ontario, Canada, during the late 1970s. These primarily encompassed isolated mining towns, forestry settlements, and small rural populations that received only the CBC's English-language signal due to geographical barriers and insufficient commercial broadcaster interest. The network's stations were funded through local cash contributions from residents, reflecting community demand for expanded programming in areas where over-the-air reception was limited to one channel.

Specific examples include Pickle Lake, a mining community where NAN's initial station faced resistance to shutdown efforts from local supporters, including miners who valued the additional content. Operations extended to other underserved locales along transportation routes, such as those serviced by tape distribution networks from Toronto, enabling videotaped broadcasts of rebroadcast shows, movies, and local ads. By targeting regions with populations too sparse for licensed broadcasters to justify infrastructure investment, NAN addressed a practical gap in service provision, though without regulatory approval.

Ontario communities served by Northern Access Network besides Pickle Lake and Longlac included Armstrong, Balmertown, Caramat, Cochenour, Dubreuilville, Ear Falls, Ignace, Mattabi Mines, Moosonee, Nakina, Sioux Lookout, South Bay Mine and Wawa. In early 1978, Manitoba stations were established at Gillam, Leaf Rapids and Lynn Lake, where the only existing television at the time was from CBC. Other stations were established in the Northwest Territories (Inuvik, Tuktoyaktuk) and in Newfoundland (St Anthony).

== Programming ==
=== Sources ===
The Northern Access Network sourced its programming primarily through unauthorized off-air recordings of television broadcasts receivable in Toronto. Operator David Brough captured content from Canadian networks including CTV and Global, as well as select American channels, without obtaining permissions from the broadcasters or regulatory approval from the Canadian Radio-television and Telecommunications Commission (CRTC). This approach involved recording live signals onto videotape, compiling segments into extended loops—typically ten hours per tape—to form the core of the playback library.

Acquisition relied on physical distribution rather than real-time transmission or licensed syndication. Completed videotapes were duplicated as needed and transported in batches via ground routes to the network's approximately 30 low-power relay stations scattered across remote northern Ontario communities, where local operators managed playback on flea-power transmitters. This method avoided the costs and legal hurdles of formal content deals, enabling the provision of entertainment otherwise inaccessible due to geographic isolation and limited over-the-air signals, though it included embedded original commercials from the recorded broadcasts.

The resulting content mix featured rebroadcasts of popular scripted series, movies, and variety shows previously aired on the sourced networks, prioritizing viewer demand for mainstream fare over original production. No evidence indicates formal partnerships or purchases from content owners; instead, the operation functioned as a de facto piracy scheme, distributing taped material to fill programming voids in areas served predominantly by a single public broadcaster channel. This bootstrapped acquisition model sustained operations from the network's inception around 1977 until enforcement actions in the early 1980s, though tape degradation and logistical challenges posed ongoing reliability issues.
