= Star Ray TV =

Unlicensed television station in Toronto

Star Ray TV (VX9AMK)
- Toronto, Ontario; Canada
- Channels: Digital: 22 (UHF) (currently off air); Virtual: 15 (currently off air)
- Branding: Star Ray TV

Programming
- Affiliations: Independent

Ownership
- Owner: Jan Pachul

History
- Founded: 1997

Technical information
- Licensing authority: CRTC
- Class: Unlicensed (pirate)
- ERP: 0.5 kW
- HAAT: 47.2 m (155 ft)
- Transmitter coordinates: 43°41′4.3″N 79°18′2.3″W

Links
- Website: Official website

VX9AMK (virtual channel 15), branded as Star Ray TV, is an unlicensed pirate independent community television station in Toronto, Ontario, Canada. Founded in 1997 by Jan Pachul, the station was established to provide community-oriented programming outside Canada's conventional broadcasting system.

The station has never held a broadcasting licence from the Canadian Radio-television and Telecommunications Commission (CRTC). According to Star Ray's website, its over-the-air broadcasts have been suspended since January 8, 2024, after its transmission facilities were removed during a dispute with its landlord. The station states that it intends to resume terrestrial broadcasting from a new location while continuing to stream programming online.

In addition, Star Ray runs an online radio station, dedicated to playing music made by artists based in Toronto.

== History ==
Star Ray TV test pattern

Jan Pachul, an amateur radio operator and electronics enthusiast, founded Star Ray TV in 1997 with the goal of creating a locally focused television service providing access to independent producers, community groups and neighbourhood organizations that received little exposure on conventional television.

Pachul applied to the CRTC for a licence to operate a low-power community television station serving Toronto on UHF channel 15. The proposal attracted five interventions from existing broadcasters.

On August 21, 2000, the CRTC denied the application. The Commission concluded that the application's proposed programming focus on Toronto's Beaches neighbourhood was inconsistent with its request for mandatory cable carriage throughout metropolitan Toronto.

Pachul criticized the decision, arguing that the CRTC was protecting established broadcasters rather than encouraging local community television.

Despite the denial, Star Ray began broadcasting on September 9, 2000, without a CRTC broadcasting licence.

The CRTC subsequently commenced enforcement proceedings. Pachul appeared before the Commission at a public hearing beginning September 19, 2001.

On October 26, 2001, the Commission found that Pachul had operated a broadcasting undertaking without a licence or exemption and ordered him to cease broadcasting by November 15, 2001.

Following the CRTC order, Star Ray continued to operate in various forms. During part of 2002, the station transmitted primarily text and still images, with Pachul arguing that text alone did not constitute "programming" under the Broadcasting Act and therefore did not violate the Commission's order.

In October 2002, the CRTC adopted a new policy framework encouraging community-based media, including low-power community television stations.

Pachul submitted another application for a broadcasting licence in 2004. According to the Canadian Communications Foundation, the CRTC never published a decision approving or denying the application. Pachul later told NOW that the application had been rejected as incomplete before he had an opportunity to respond.

By 2007, Star Ray had resumed broadcasting conventional television programming. The station's schedule included locally produced talk shows, public affairs programming, community announcements, religious broadcasts, public-domain feature films and programming purchased by community organizations.

Alternate Star Ray TV logo

In addition to its over-the-air broadcasts, Star Ray expanded onto the Internet by streaming portions of its programming online.

=== Digital broadcasting ===
Star Ray originally broadcast on analog UHF channel 15. Following CHCH-DT's move to physical UHF channel 15 during Canada's digital television transition, Star Ray moved its physical transmission to UHF channel 22 while retaining virtual channel 15.

By 2019, RabbitEars listed the station as operating a single digital subchannel on virtual channel 15.1 using physical channel 22 with an effective radiated power of 0.5 kW.

=== 2024 suspension of over-the-air broadcasts ===
According to Star Ray's website, the station ceased over-the-air broadcasting on January 8, 2024, after its transmission facilities were removed from their longtime location.

The station states that the shutdown resulted from a dispute with its landlord and that its transmitter, antenna and studio equipment were removed from the premises.

Star Ray also announced that it intended to continue providing internet streaming while seeking a new location from which to resume terrestrial broadcasting. This was announced during an interview the station posted to one of its domains on August 13, 2026.

== Programming ==
Star Ray describes itself as a community-access television station intended to provide programming and airtime for individuals and organizations that receive little exposure on mainstream television.

Programming has included locally produced interview programs, community affairs, multicultural programming, independent productions, religious broadcasts, older feature films and community bulletin-board services.

The station has also sold blocks of airtime to community organizations and independent producers wishing to broadcast programming outside the conventional broadcasting system.

== Technical information ==
Before the suspension of its terrestrial service, Star Ray broadcast digitally on physical UHF channel 22 and used virtual channel 15. RabbitEars recorded a single standard-definition subchannel identified as "StarRay", with an effective radiated power of 0.5 kW.

=== Former subchannel ===
Former subchannel of VX9AMK
Channel	Video	Aspect	Short name	Programming
15.1	480i	16:9	StarRay	Star Ray TV

== Legal status ==
Star Ray did not hold a conventional broadcasting licence from the CRTC. In its 2001 mandatory order, the Commission determined that Pachul had operated a broadcasting undertaking without a licence or exemption and ordered him to cease doing so except in accordance with the Broadcasting Act.

The regulation of radio-frequency transmitting equipment is administered separately by Innovation, Science and Economic Development Canada, formerly Industry Canada. According to the Canadian Communications Foundation, Pachul had at one point received temporary technical authorization from Industry Canada for the transmitter, but this did not amount to a CRTC broadcasting licence.
