= Televisie Vrij Apeldoorn =

Dutch pirate television station

- Country: Netherlands
- Broadcast area: Apeldoorn
- Headquarters: Leiden

Programming
- Language: Dutch
- Picture format: 576i (4:3 SDTV)

History
- Launched: 1981; 45 years ago
- Closed: 1982; 44 years ago

Televisie Vrij Apeldoorn (Television Free Apeldoorn, abbreviated TVA) was a pirate television station in Apeldoorn, Gelderland. The station broadcast on the local cable network on Nederland 1 late at night (from 11:30pm), airing local events and adult movies.

== History ==
The station was reportedly operational in May 1981 on Nederland 1's frequency on Kabelcom Apeldoorn. Two technicians working for the company were shocked at the broadcast of a porn film on the cable network. The station's first presenter was Gerrit Pijpstra; it broadcast local news and documentaries on local events. Most of the adult films were Austrian productions.

Footage of TVA was uploaded onto YouTube by Christian Gijteenbeek and became an online success.

Long after its 1982 closure, a new legal television station for Apeldoorn was created (TV Apeldoorn), but closed in 2021 and was in a license dispute with Samen1, a local radio station, in 2025.
