= Televisão Amadora de Pernes =

Canal Zero
- Country: Portugal
- Broadcast area: Santarém
- Headquarters: Pernes, Santarém

Programming
- Language: Portuguese
- Picture format: 576i (4:3 SDTV)

Ownership
- Owner: Televisão Amadora de Pernes

History
- Launched: 12 June 1980; 45 years ago
- Closed: 1981; 45 years ago

Availability

Terrestrial
- VHF analog: Broadcasting on the same frequency as RTP1 after closedown (1980-1981)

Televisão Amadora de Pernes (TVA, also known as Televisão Regional de Pernes, while still using the aforementioned initials) was a pirate television station in the parish of Pernes, in the city of Santarém in central-southern Portugal. It was reportedly the first such station in operation, claiming to start a full color service before RTP did. The station was founded by José Guilherme Paradiz, who previously had similar experiences on radio.

== History ==
José Guilherme Paradiz previously established a pirate radio station in 1959 during the height of the New State regime; the station closed in 1960, seventeen years before the start of the first wave of pirate radio stations. Long after its closure, Paradiz set up his own television station, which was later taken to the courts.

In 1979, Paradiz founded TVA, in color, claiming it to be the first to do so before RTP finished its conversion. Regular broadcasts started on 12 June 1980, coinciding with José Paradiz's anniversary. TVA's broadcasts began after RTP1's closedown at night

For its first anniversary, TV Regional de Pernes/TVA started producing TV Regional, shown every week. The first anniversary special was described by Paradiz himself as a "surprise edition", following a funeral of one of his friends the previous day. After the pilot experiment, TVA shut down and José Paradiz went to court.

Paradiz's efforts led to a hijack experiment on 26 May 1984 by Hélder Lucas, who decided to use the Montejunto transmitter to deliver the announcement of the birth of his daughter.
