= Televisão de Espinho =

- Country: Portugal
- Broadcast area: Espinho
- Headquarters: Espinho

Programming
- Language: Portuguese
- Picture format: 576i (4:3 SDTV)

Ownership
- Owner: Alberto Pinho

History
- Launched: 1987; 39 years ago
- Closed: 1988; 38 years ago

Availability

Terrestrial
- UHF analog: Channel 22

Televisão de Espinho, better known as Canal 22 (Channel 22), was a pirate television station broadcasting from Espinho. It operated for approximately one year.

== History ==
Established by Alberto Pinho of Estúdios Nova Onda, owner of Rádio Nova Onda, the channel was reported to be in operation as early as May 1987. starting from 10pm. The line-up included a local news service, filmed reports and its key component, feature films. On Mondays it also aired highlights of S. C. Espinho matches. Lena Macedo was its continuity announcer who also promoted programs for the sister radio station.

It is not known when exactly did the station start and when did it end. A November 2020 article chronicling the history of local broadcasting in Espinho published on Defesa de Espinho claims that the station was on air for "practically one year", implying that the station closed in the early months of 1988. Unlike other pirate stations, the station shut down due to fears that its equipment would be destroyed by the authorities. Local radio continued in Espinho until 2011, when the last station was sold off to Rádio 5.
