= TV Maravilha =

- Country: Portugal
- Broadcast area: Porto metropolitan area
- Headquarters: Porto

Programming
- Language(s): Portuguese
- Picture format: 576i (4:3 SDTV)

History
- Launched: February 12, 1984; 41 years ago
- Closed: February 12, 1984; 41 years ago

Availability

Terrestrial
- UHF analog: Channel 7

TV Maravilha was a pirate television station broadcasting in Porto.

The station was one of the first pirate television stations to appear in the country, presenting itself as an alternative to the state television channels that made up the monopoly, which at the time were two (RTP1 and RTP2). Its only broadcast was of a test pattern and despite attempts at promising a comeback, it never did.

== History ==
Before the emergence of TV Maravilha, there were illegal relays of TVE1 and TVE2 available in northern Portugal. The relays started in the Alto Minho region and later spread to Porto in 1980. To receive these relays a special antenna was installed receiving Spanish signals before being relayed to a restricted area. Eventually by 1982, a group of technicians in Senhora da Hora were able to produce their own signals, by airing feature films, most of which were pornographic features, after RTP1's closedown. In early 1983 in Francelos, a radio amateur started delivering his own signals overnight (from 2am) in an area between Espinho and Afurada, in Vila Nova de Gaia. The usage of relays to broadcast foreign television channels at the time was considered illegal by the Geneva Convention.

At around 11:30 on the morning of February 12, 1984, TVE1's relayer located in Santo Ovídio on VHF channel 7 was jammed during a sports program. A test pattern saying "TV MARAVILHA - PORTO" was broadcast accompanied by the message "Em breve emissões regulares" (Regular broadcasts soon).

The cost of operating TV Maravilha was of approximately 80 contos. The most expensive piece of equipment was a video recorder with UHF jack, costing between 50 and 60 contos in the black market, a UHF amplifier and an antenna adapter. Its equipment was built from scratch as well as some army equipment from the Colonial War.

After the initial broadcast the TV Maravilha producer, nicknamed "Coca-Cola" to evade police intervention, reportedly contacted Os Comediantes, a local professional theatre team, as well as the promise of airing the American made-for-TV film The Day After, having bought the tapes for it. Programs were scheduled for Sunday mornings, yet no further broadcasts were made.
