= Channel Zero (video encoding) =

Channel-Zero encoding, in video surveillance or NVR systems, is an option to configure the video recorder to stream a video feed composed of multiple camera views (channels) in one split-picture view. This allows the recording system to send one frame to a remote system, rather than numerous frames of the individual channels; thereby reducing the bandwidth used/needed to transmit the feed.

This terminology is brand-agnostic, i.e. spans multiple companies and manufacturers of video surveillance systems, such as:

- HikVision
- LAView
- MyCam
- JVC
- Swann
