= Lathrop, Michigan =

- Unincorporated community
- Location within the state of Michigan
- Coordinates: 46°08′53″N 87°13′20″W
- Country: United States
- State: Michigan
- County: Delta
- Township: Maple Ridge
- Elevation: 1,033 ft (315 m)
- Time zone: UTC-5 (Eastern (EST))
  - Summer (DST): UTC-4 (EDT)
- ZIP code(s): 49880
- Area code: 906
- GNIS feature ID: 1617673

Lathrop is an unincorporated community in Delta County, in the U.S. state of Michigan.

== History ==
A post office was established at Lathrop in 1873, and remained in operation until it was discontinued in 1945. The community was named for Azel Lathrop, the owner of the original town site.
