= TV Jovem Pan =

Brazilian television station

TV Jovem Pan was a television station in São Paulo, Brazil which broadcast on Channel 16 UHF. Its headquarters were at Barra Funda, São Paulo. It was owned by Grupo Jovem Pan.

== History ==
TV Jovem Pan was the first television station in Brazil founded exclusively for journalism and was inspired by the 24-hour news cycle seen on American news channel CNN.

Founded in 1990, TV Jovem Pan was the result of a partnership between businessman Antonio Augusto Amaral de Carvalho (Tuta), owner of Radio Jovem Pan, João Carlos di Genio (Goal), and Fernando Vieira de Mello, who shortly after sold his shares to Hamilton Lucas de Oliveira, owner of the IBF (Brazilian Industry Forms).

Since its origin, the station faced discord among the business groups involved. Differences over programming content hampered operations.

TV Jovem Pan's programming was mainly documentaries, journalism and sports - especially football and soccer broadcasting in the team sports on Radio Jovem Pan AM.

A scandal involving Lucas de Oliveira and his IBF shook the channel. Tuta withdrew from society and the station was run by João Carlos di Genio. In 1993, the lineup changed to reruns. The Barra Funda headquarters and their modern equipment were sold to Rede Record.

== See also ==
- Jovem Pan
