= 3 Antena =

Clandestine TV station in Rio de Janeiro

- Rio de Janeiro; Brazil
- Channels: Analog: 8 (VHF)

Programming
- Language: Portuguese

History
- First air date: 6 May 1990
- Last air date: 29 August 1990

3 Antena was a Brazilian clandestine television station based in Rio de Janeiro. It broadcast on VHF channel 8. It was part of a broader movement that encouraged the operation of several clandestine television stations along the Rio-São Paulo axis between the late 1980s and the early 1990s.

== History ==
=== Antecedents of clandestine television in Rio de Janeiro (1986–1987) ===
The emergence of a clandestine television station in Rio de Janeiro occurred in 1986, with the creation of TVento Levou, which operated on VHF channel 3. The station debuted on November 1, when it inserted audio interference into TV Globo Rio de Janeiro during the broadcast of Jornal Nacional, announcing an "emergency situation" and asking viewers to tune in to channel 3, where it aired a protest against the station's "monopoly".

The station had a team of 15 people and its signal initially reached two streets in Copacabana. Shortly afterwards, the installation of a more powerful transmitter allowed its coverage to expand to the entire South Zone of the municipality.

At 8:00 p.m. on Christmas Eve 1986 (December 24), TVento Levou went on the air on channel 13, previously occupied by the then-defunct TV Rio. The broadcast featured parodies of Roberto Carlos' year-end specials on Rede Globo and of then-president José Sarney. After the transmission, the National Telecommunications Department (DENTEL) searched for the station's transmitters, believed to be located in apartments in Rio'S South Zone, but was unsuccessful.

The last recordings of TVento Levou's broadcasts occurred in April 1987.

=== 3 Antena ===
On June 5, 1990, two months after the dissolution of DENTEL, 3 Antena went on the air operating on channel 8, using equipment installed in Rio's South Zone. The transmission included obscene images, a dubbed video in which Roberto Marinho entrepreneur and founder of Rede Globo, explained how to set up a mini clandestine station and a "tribute" to President Fernando Collor celebrating the end of the agency that had prevented clandestine broadcasts.

From July 10 to 14 of the same year, 3 Antena broadcast daily for two hours. On the first day, a group of people who watched the transmission on a television set installed in a bar in the Flamengo neighborhood were taken by the Federal Police to give testimony. Among them was former congressman Liszt Vieira (PT), considered the spokesperson of the clandestine television movement.

The police action was heavy-handed and resulted in the fracture of journalist Rose Gomes' wrist. Her husband, Derilson Melo, was taken in handcuffs to the agency's headquarters at Praça Mauá.

In August 1990, 3 Antena and TV Cubo, a pirate station based in the city of São Paulo, planned a joint broadcast of programs produced by both stations. The initiative was canceled, however, due to a disagreement with the São Paulo broadcaster over the content produced by the Rio group, which was considered "scatological", in contrast to the community-oriented and local programming produced by TV Cubo.

On August 29 of the same year, amid the 1990 elections, the station aired a program parodying the electoral advertisements of the candidates for deputy in Rio de Janeiro, and conducted interviews with members of the public on the topic. In an excerpt, the team even encouraged interviewees to express support for a fictitious candidacy by Iraqi politician Saddam Hussein. This broadcast was the last recorded transmission by 3 Antena.
