= Televisão Castanheirense =

- Country: Portugal
- Broadcast area: Castanheira de Pera
- Headquarters: Castanheira de Pera

Programming
- Language: Portuguese
- Picture format: 576i (4:3 SDTV)

Ownership
- Owner: Televisão Castanheirense

History
- Launched: 4 July 1987; 39 years ago
- Closed: 4 July 1988; 38 years ago

Availability

Terrestrial
- UHF analog: Unknown

Televisão Castanheirense (TVC) was a television station in Castanheira de Pera. It only held two broadcasts on 4 July 1987 and 4 July 1988 on one of the channels used to retransmit foreign satellite services.

== History ==
=== Background ===
A satellite dish was installed in 1986 by the municipality of Castanheira de Pêra, precisely at a time when locals perceived RTP as boring, compared to when it was in black and white. The satellite system was officially inaugurated on 4 July 1987, comprising four channels: two fixed channels and two channels which rotated between different services. This led to the creation of TVC, which was created precisely on the date of its introduction.

=== First broadcast ===
The first broadcast took place on 4 July 1987 (municipal holiday) starting with images of the municipality accompanied by soundtrack from Johann Sebastian Bach, followed by Rancho dos Neveiros do Coentral. The first program featured a succession of interviews: mayor Carlos Searas, painter Ernâni Lopes, Júlio Henriques, president of the Administratice Council of Ribeirapera, SA, Joaquim Rodrigues, who attended Lar de Idosos da S.C.M. de Castanheira de Pêra, Manuel Tomás Barateiro, António Dinis (immigrant in Brazil, with his daughters who were on vacation), Artur Coelho Antunes from Retorta, Manuel Gomes from Capercamis and Pedro Barjona from Fiandeira who was the acting mayor as of the early 2000s. The last interview was given to Domingos Francisco, who helped assist its production.

=== Second broadcast ===
After the success of the previous year's broadcast by locals, the initiative was repeated on 4 July 1988, this time with a title: Castanheira de Pêra, Passado, Presente e Futuro.

This program took more time to prepare given the one-year gap between the two broadcasts, but it faced a series of problems. The studio's lighting consisted of a tanning lamp (which was no longer tanning), serving as support for cameraman Alcides Coelho. Highlights consisted of interviews on the street and in schools, as well as a sketch on Lainte (older slang used by industrial workers and businessmen), which was translated into conventional Portuguese by Domingos. There was also a report on Cercicaper, which was in its tenth anniversary year, and a long news bulletin. Both broadcasts were only finished five minutes before airing.

=== Shutdown ===
TVC did not make a third broadcast. Between 1988 and 1989, the authorities gradually removed municipal satellite dishes, with the one in Castanheira surviving until early 1989.
