= Televisão do Nordeste =

- Country: Portugal
- Broadcast area: Bragança
- Headquarters: Bragança

Programming
- Language: Portuguese
- Picture format: 576i (4:3 SDTV)

Ownership
- Owner: Televisão do Nordeste

History
- Launched: February 12, 1990; 36 years ago
- Closed: February 12, 1990; 36 years ago

Televisão do Nordeste (TVN) was a one-time pirate television station that operated on RTP2's frequency in the city of Bragança, Portugal, one night in February 1990, whose sole broadcast was a regional news program that had political consequences.

== History ==
The founder of TVN was Manuel da Costa Nunes, born in Nampula in Mozambique under Portuguese control in October 1964, having moved to Bragança in July 1975. At the time of setting up TVN, he was taking an audiovisual course at CCJ-FAOJ, the current IPDJ, where after the shutdown of the TV station he worked at, he founded production companies. He was also responsible for producing RENAMO's election campaign in the 1994 Mozambican general election, the first free elections held in independent Mozambique.

On February 12, 1990, after the end of Jornal das 9, RTP2's transmitter was replaced by an unknown checkerboard test card, followed by TVN's start-up, promising broadcasts on Mondays at 9pm. RTP started receiving complaints regarding the interference of RTP2 in Bragança, where its signal was carried by a private transmitter, which captured the signal from Serra de Bornes, enabling the channel to broadcast properly to the city. In order to replace the broadcast, the group moved closer to the transmitter and began delivering a stronger signal. The only program broadcast by TVN was Notícias, which covered, among other events, the gathering of the municipal assembly and some party gatherings, as well as a sports segment with highlights from a local football match: Vianense-Bragança. Official entities appeared in the only broadcast, both the Mayor and Civil Governor of Bragança. The channel quickly became criticized for taking over RTP2's signal, and regarding possible consequences. The team behind the broadcast refused to make an official announcement to RTP. The private transmitter was eventually dismounted and it was unknown if a second broadcast was scheduled for February 19.

As a consequence of the illegal broadcast of TVN and his brief appearance, Civil Governor Júlio de Carvalho announced his exoneration on February 15, a request accepted by Manuel Pereira. In the broadcast, he mentioned that the opposition party PSD was "the skinheads of politics".
