= Canal Zero =

- Country: Portugal
- Broadcast area: Lisbon metropolitan area
- Headquarters: Loures or Odivelas

Programming
- Language: Portuguese
- Picture format: 576i (4:3 SDTV)

Ownership
- Owner: Canal Zero

History
- Launched: January 1987; 39 years ago
- Closed: 23 July 1987; 38 years ago

Availability

Terrestrial
- UHF analog: Unknown

Canal Zero (Channel Zero) was a Portuguese pirate television station operating out of Loures (or Odivelas, reports vary). It emerged shortly after the closure of Televisão Regional de Loures and operated for approximately six months.

== History ==
Canal Zero was reportedly in operation at the start of 1987. Reportedly, local programming included a supposed comedy series, set in local restaurants and bakeries, filmed on a camera which also served as a microphone, which was imperceptible, because the actors were far from the camera. Additionally, it received an endorsement from Adam Curry, where he reportedly said the name of the channel.

Carlos Soares was one of the staff in charge of the station. During its existence, the government was approving the creation of legal private television channels, saying that the station would continue as it is, in terms of programming, as it was meant to be a local channel (the bids were for national channels).

On 23 July 1987, the station, as well as two other stations in Amadora (RTA and TRA), was shut down by orders of the Judicial Police, having its antenna sealed, its equipment apprehended and the staff responsible for its broadcast being identified.
