= Channel D (Irish TV channel) =

- Country: Ireland
- Broadcast area: Dublin
- Headquarters: Dublin

Programming
- Language(s): English
- Picture format: 576i (4:3 SDTV)

Ownership
- Owner: Independent Dublin Television

History
- Launched: April 25, 1981; 43 years ago
- Closed: October 1981; 43 years ago

Availability

Terrestrial
- VHF analog: Channel C in the Irish 625-line system

Channel D, initially intended to be Channel 3, was an Irish pirate television station broadcasting from the north side of Dublin. The station existed for a few months in 1981 before shutting down.

== History ==
The creation of Channel D - Independent Television Dublin was first reported in April 1981, with the planned airing of uncensored movies on the station, initially supposed to be called Channel 3, much to the irritation of extant cinema owners. The launch of the channel would pose the shutdown of cinema halls or would stop submitting movies to the censor. The station went on air as Channel 3 on 25 April 1981 using a weak television signal, touted as "amateur" by one observer. Output consisted mostly of movies, except on Saturdays when a local interest programme was broadcast. Early in its existence, Channel 3 was advertised on Alternative Radio Dublin.

By June, the channel had been renamed Channel D, conducting periodical test broadcasts. In July, the station expanded to a former BBC transmitter with the radius of its signal increasing from three miles to fifteen. By August 1981, broadcasts started in a sudden manner, without warning. The station was financed by "a large number of commercial interests" who provided local television for Dublin "at no extra cost", broadcasting from the State Cinema in Phibsborough. Regular colour service began on 20 August 1981, broadcasting its output daily for the first time. Don Moore announced in the press that Channel D would attract an audience of thousands. Broadcasts were held on Thursdays; the next broadcast on 27 August had the same edition of Dublin Profile aired the previous week, and operated for two hours, being repeated for the next few days on an infrequent basis.

Other plans for Channel D included the creation of Ireland's first breakfast television programme, which was set to start on 2 September 1981, running from 9:30am to 11:30am. In September, Channel D aired horror and sci-fi B-movies: Weed: The Florida Connection, Silent Night, Bloody Night, White Comanche, Aliens from Spaceship Earth (documentary on cult groups), Panic City and Children Shouldn't Play with Dead Things. These movies were repeated in mid-October when the station was broadcasting again on an infrequent basis. By the end of October 1981, the station shut down, primarily due to the high concentration of cable television in the city, as well as its shoestring budget and failing to reach its ambitions.
