= Televisão Regional de Loures =

- Country: Portugal
- Broadcast area: Lisbon metropolitan area
- Headquarters: Loures

Programming
- Language: Portuguese
- Picture format: 576i (4:3 SDTV)

Ownership
- Owner: Televisão Regional de Loures

History
- Launched: January 1986; 40 years ago
- Closed: December 1986; 39 years ago

Availability

Terrestrial
- UHF analog: Frequencies varied and changed often

Televisão Regional de Loures (abbreviated TRL) was a pirate television station broadcasting from Loures in the metropolitan area of Lisbon. The channel was one of the most-watched pirate television stations in Portugal, to an extent where it received visits from renowned figures of the media sector. The station operated in 1986 before shutting down at the end of the year.

== History ==
In 1985, at a time when RTP's two channels made up the national television monopoly, word of a pirate television station in Loures started spreading in by word-of-mouth, with viewers trying to find the signal. Broadcasts started in January 1986. In order to prevent closures, the station regularly interrupted its programming and changed its frequencies. A group of friends led by two electronics technicians set up the station. Around January 1986, TRL was received by as many as 300,000 viewers in the Lisbon metropolitan area, "stolen" from RTP, according to press estimates. Some sources claim the number was 500,000.

Initially located in a small TV repair office, TRL eventually changed its facilities to larger premises, returning with a stronger and more powerful transmitter. The station was funded by commercial advertising, which was used to finance the equipment used. The channel also had a heavy metal program.

Like every other local pirate television station, TRL was shut down by order of state repression. Despite its successes to tackle RTP's monopoly, as well as numerous technical uncertainties, attempts to counter the law and legalize its transmissions, TRL announced its closure in December 1986 due to financial difficulties. In 1987, the government confiscated its equipment, hindering chances for its revival.
