= Mette Edvardsen =

Norwegian choreographer, dancer and artist

Mette Edvardsen is a choreographer, dancer, and performance artist from Norway, who lives and works in Brussels, Belgium.

== Early life ==
Mette Edvardsen was born in Norway.

== Dance career ==
=== Collaboration with les ballets C de la B ===
Since 1996, Edvardsen has her home base in Brussels, Belgium, where she started working as a dancer and performer for the choreographers Hans Van den Broeck (1996-2000) and Christine De Smedt (2000-2005) when they were still connected to les ballets C de la B. She was a performer in (They feed we) Eat, eat, eat (Hans Van den Broeck / les ballets C de la B, 1996), Au Progrès (Hans Van den Broeck / les ballets C de la B, 1997), La sortie (Hans Van den Broeck / les ballets C de la B, 1999) and 9 X 9 (Christine De Smedt / les ballets C de la B, 2000). She also assisted director / choreographer Hans Van den Broeck on Lac des singes (Hans Van den Broeck / les ballets C de la B, 2001). These productions toured internationally. She also contributed to 1, 2, 3 / Propositions (2005) of les ballets C de la B.

=== Own artistic work ===
Since 2002 Edvardsen has developed her own work. Although some of her works explore other media or formats - such as videos, books and texts - her interest always lies in their relationship with performing arts as a practice and situation. Whatever the chosen medium is, Edvardsen consistently examines the boundaries of language, time and space. Her first production, Private Collection (Edvardsen, 2002), was a performance about how we organize, collect and organize things. She explored concepts like presence/absence, transformation and disappearance. In the later trilogy consisting of Black (Edvardsen, 2011), No Title (Edvardsen, 2014) and We to Be (Edvardsen, 2015), she examined the possibilities and limitations of language in the real and imaginary space. She looked at what is not, to provoke thoughts and fantasies. In oslo (2017), a solo and anagram, she extends the concept of the solo into the entire theatre space, where thoughts, words, things and actions multiply.

Edvardsen's pieces operate in an interim time and interim space. They play out in the interval, in the blank space that occurs between two words (Black (Edvardsen, 2011)), between a performance and a score (Opening (Edvardsen, 2005)), between a book and a listener (Time has fallen asleep in the afternoon sunshine (Edvardsen, 2010)), between a live and a recorded action (Time will show (Edvardsen, 2004)), coffee & cigarette (2006 and 2008)). In her work, she uses repetition as a strategy, as a way of making things visible, of activating them. She is more interested in the interest of the audience in things than in the things themselves. She is also interested in how situations leave traces in memory, and how memory becomes an active part of reading something. Her work is both profound and witty, sober and rich in detail. By using a playful approach to thoughts and references Edvardsen examines how language can be used to form pictures in the heads of the audience.

Edvardsen performs her work worldwide. A retrospective overview of her work was presented in 2015 at the Black Box Theater in Oslo, Norway. With her book every now and then (Edvardsen, 2009) she was laureate of the Prix Fernand Baudin 2009, a prize awarded by a specialized jury to books from the Brussels-Capital Region and Wallonia, which demonstrate an outstanding quality both in their conception (editorial and graphic) and in their production (printing and binding). In 2013 she was the chairman of the jury that awarded the Prix Fernand Baudin, and together with graphic designer Joris Kritis she was responsible for the catalogue published on the occasion the award ceremony that year. In 2016, Edvardsen received for her project We to be (Edvardsen, 2015), the Norwegian Ibsen Award, a prestigious award awarded annually since 1986 to a Norwegian theater author by the municipality of Skien (the birthplace of playwright Henrik Ibsen).

=== Manyone and Athome ===
In 2013, Edvardsen created, together with the artists Sarah Vanhee, Alma Söderberg and Juan Dominguez, Manyone, a supportive structure that helps them organize their work in both a sustainable and tailor-made way to their individual practice. The organization originated from a sense of solidarity and the desire to connect and support each other as artists. Manyone is not a label, but a collaboration structure that respects the individual autonomy of the four artists involved. They develop and finance their work independently. The organization receives structural funding from the Flemish government based on the Kunstendecreet (Arts Decree). In addition to Manyone, Edvardsen also has her own structure for the production of her work: Athome.

=== Other collaborations ===
In 2002–2003, Edvardsen produced, in collaboration with Heine Avdal, Liv Hanne Haugen and Lawrence Malstaf, the production Sauna in Exile, a performance / installation that takes the sauna, the cliché of Norwegian identity, as point of departure. With Heine Avdal, she again collaborated in 2008 as a performer in you are here (Heine Avdal, Christoph De Boeck and Yukiko Shinozaki / deepblue, 2008). In 2003, she danced in Common Senses by Thomas Hauert, a Swiss choreographer who resides in Brussels. This choreography is part of the production 5 (Thomas Hauert, Mark Lorimer, Sarah Ludi, Samantha van Wissen and Mat Voorter / ZOO, 2003). In 2004, she worked as a dancer / choreographer together with her colleagues Christine De Smedt and Mårten Spångberg on Schreibstück - 11. Version Christine De Smedt, Ghent (BE), a performance of a dance score by the German choreographer Thomas Lehmen (2002-2004). With Christine De Smedt, Edvardsen collaborated again in 2010 when they created the mass choreography The Long Piece (Christine De Smedt and Edvardsen, 2010) created for the Ostend festival Dansand! - edition II. With Mårten Spångberg, she collaborated again in 2017 as a dancer in his production Gerhard Richter, une pièce pour le théâtre (Mårten Spångberg, 2017) for the Brussels Kunstenfestivaldesarts.

In 2004 Edvardsen also participated in Act 1 PRELUDE from The Invisible Dances (2004 – 2006) by Bock & Vincenzi. In 2005, she was part of DOCUMENT 4 (Lynda Gaudreau, 2005) and Music and Words on the DOCUMENT 4 Project (2005) by the Canadian choreographer Lynda Gaudreau. In 2008, she made for the first edition of the Dansand! Festival the production Easy Pieces (Mette Evardsen and Paul Gazzola, 2008) with the Australian artist Paul Gazzola, with whom she already collaborated on La sortie (Hans Van den Broeck / les ballets C de la B, 1999). In 2011, she mentored Joanna Bailie and Christoph Ragg as a movement coach on the creation of C.O. JOURNEY #2. In 2012, she also collaborated with visual artist Manon de Boer. One of the three parts of her video one, two, many (Manon de Boer, 2012) is a spoken monologue by Edvardsen. A year later, she participated as a performer in the production This place (Marcos Simoes and Sara Manente, 2013). In 2014, she participated, together with the theorist and performance artist Bojana Cvejic, in the sixth episode of Bauer Hour, a monthly event ('talk show, variety show, shit show, parlor show and cabaret show') by the American choreographer / dancer Eleanor Bauer at the Kaaitheater in Brussels. The performance Penelope Sleeps is a collaboration with composer and performer Matteo Fargion. The small ensemble production is induced by the relationship between dream and action, voice and language, body and music, suggesting alternative scenarios for the Ancient Greek female role figure of Penelope.

== Research and teaching ==
Edvardsen is a research fellow at the Kunsthøgskolen in Oslo (Oslo National Academy of the Arts. Her research project, Writing in Space and Time, explores text and language as a raw material for dance practice. She also regularly hosts workshops, lectures and presentations of her work, including at the Jan van Eyck Academie, Maastricht (2009); Kunstakademiet i Tromsø (Academy of Contemporary Art and Creative Writing in Tromsø) (2010); Luca School of Arts, Ghent (2011); eXplore dance festival, Bucharest (2014); Reykjavik Dance Festival 2015 and the Kunstenfestivaldesarts, Brussels (2017). In 2016, she participated at the Brussels Kaaitheater also in The Permeable Stage, a 10-hour research event by choreographer / dancer Mette Ingvartsen dedicated to investigating the politics of sexuality and its proximal relations to privacy and the public sphere.

== Productions ==
Own work:

- Private collection (Mette Edvardsen, 2002)
- Stills (Mette Edvardsen, 2002)
- Light Shade Shade (Mette Edvardsen, 2004)
- Time will show (detail) (Mette Edvardsen, 2004)
- Opening (Mette Edvardsen, 2005/2006)
- Opening (the text) (Mette Edvardsen, 2006)
- The way/ you move (Mette Edvardsen, 2006)
- coffee & cigarette (Mette Edvardsen, 2006–2008)
- or else nobody will know (Mette Edvardsen, 2007)
- Artist in Residence (Mette Edvardsen and Heiko Gölzer, 2007)
- Faits divers (Mette Edvardsen, 2008)
- Easy Pieces (Mette Edvardsenen and Paul Gazzola, 2008)
- every now and then (Mette Edvardsen, 2009)
- Time has fallen asleep in the afternoon sunshine (Mette Edvardsen, 2010)
- The Long Piece (Mette Edvardsen and Christine De Smedt, 2010)
- Black (Mette Edvardsen, 2011)
- No Title (Mette Edvardsen, 2014)
- We to be (Mette Edvardsen, 2015)
- I can’t quite place it (Mette Edvardsen, 2015)
- oslo (Mette Edvardsen, 2017)

With others:

- (They feed we) Eat, eat, eat (Hans Van den Broeck / les ballets C de la B, 1996)
- Au Progrès (Hans Van den Broeck / les ballets C de la B, 1997)
- La Sortie (Hans Van den Broeck / les ballets C de la B, 1999)
- Lac des Singes (Hans Van den Broeck / les ballets C de la B, 2001)
- 9 X 9 (Christine De Smedt / les ballets C de la B, 2000)
- 5 (Mark Lorimer, Samantha van Wissen, Mat Voorter and Thomas Hauert / ZOO, 2003)
- Schreibstück - 11. Version Christine De Smedt, Gent (BE) (Thomas Lehmen, 2002–2004)
- The Invisible Dances (Bock & Vincenzi, 2004 – 2006)
- Document 4 (Lynda Gaudreau / Compagnie De Brune, 2005)
- Music and Words on the DOCUMENT 4 Project (Lynda Gaudreau / Compagnie De Brune, 2005)
- you are here (Heine Avdal, Christoph De Boeck and Yukiko Shinozaki / deepblue, 2008)
- one, two, many (Manon de Boer, 2012)
- This Place (Sara Manente and Marcos Simoes, 2013)
- Bauer Hour #6 (Eleanor Bauer / Good Move, 2014)
- Gerhard Richter, une pièce pour le théâtre (Mårten Spångberg, 2017)
- Penelope Sleeps (Music Matteo Fargion) Wiener Festwochen 2019

== Sources ==
- Website of Mette Edvardsen
- Kunstenpunt – Persons – Mette Edvardsen on the website of the Flemish Arts Institute
- Vimeo channel of Mette Edvardsen
