= Fieldworks vzw =

Artistic organization based in Brussels

fieldworks is an organisation located in Brussels, which creates, produces, distributes and promotes the artistic work of Heine Avdal and Yukiko Shinozaki.

== History ==
Heine Avdal and Yukiko Shinozaki met in the second half of the 90s when they both worked as dancers at Damaged Goods, the Brussels company of the American choreographer Meg Stuart. In 2002, they founded, together with sound artist Christoph De Boeck, the organisation deepblue to realise their own projects. That organisation was active until 2012. Afterwards, Heine Avdal and Yukiko Shinozaki continued with their own organisation, fieldworks. Since the second half of 2014, the business leader is Bob Van Langendonck, who came from P.A.R.T.S.

== Artistic work ==
Although Heine Avdal and Yukiko Shinozaki both had a dance training, they do not create 'dance' in the classical sense of the word. In their work, they seek a connection with a wide range of art disciplines and expertises, and work with various other artists. They are internationally renowned for their productions on the boundary between dance, visual arts, music and technology. Regularly, their work consists of poetic and humorous interventions in unusual, semi-public environments like offices, hotels and supermarkets.

== Recognition ==
fieldworks has already performed in many countries. The organisation is financially supported by the Flemish government for the period 2017–2021 on the basis of the Kunstendecreet (Art Decree). Also in the period from 2013 to 2016, the organisation received a structural operating grant from the same government. Their work is often co-produced by institutions such as the Kaaitheater (Brussels), STUK (Leuven), Kunstencentrum BUDA (Kortrijk), Pact Zollverein (Essen), BIT Teatergarasjen (Bergen), Black Box Theater (Oslo) and Theater House Avantgarden (Trondheim).

== Productions ==
- drop a line (2007)
- Field Works-hotel (2009)
- Field Works-office (2010)
- Borrowed Landscape (2011)
- nothing's for something (2012)
- The seventh floor of the world (2013)
- distant voices (2014)
- as if nothing has been spinning around for something to remember (2014)
- carry on (2015)
- THE OTHEROOM (2016)
- unannounced (2017)

== Sources ==
- Kunstenpunt - Organisations – fieldworks vzw according to Kunstenpunt
- Kunstenpunt – Performing Arts in Flanders - Producers – fieldworks vzw according to Kunstenpunt
- Website of fieldworks
