= Riverside Studios =

Arts centre and television studios in Hammersmith, London, England

Coordinates: 51°29′17.9″N 0°13′41.1″W

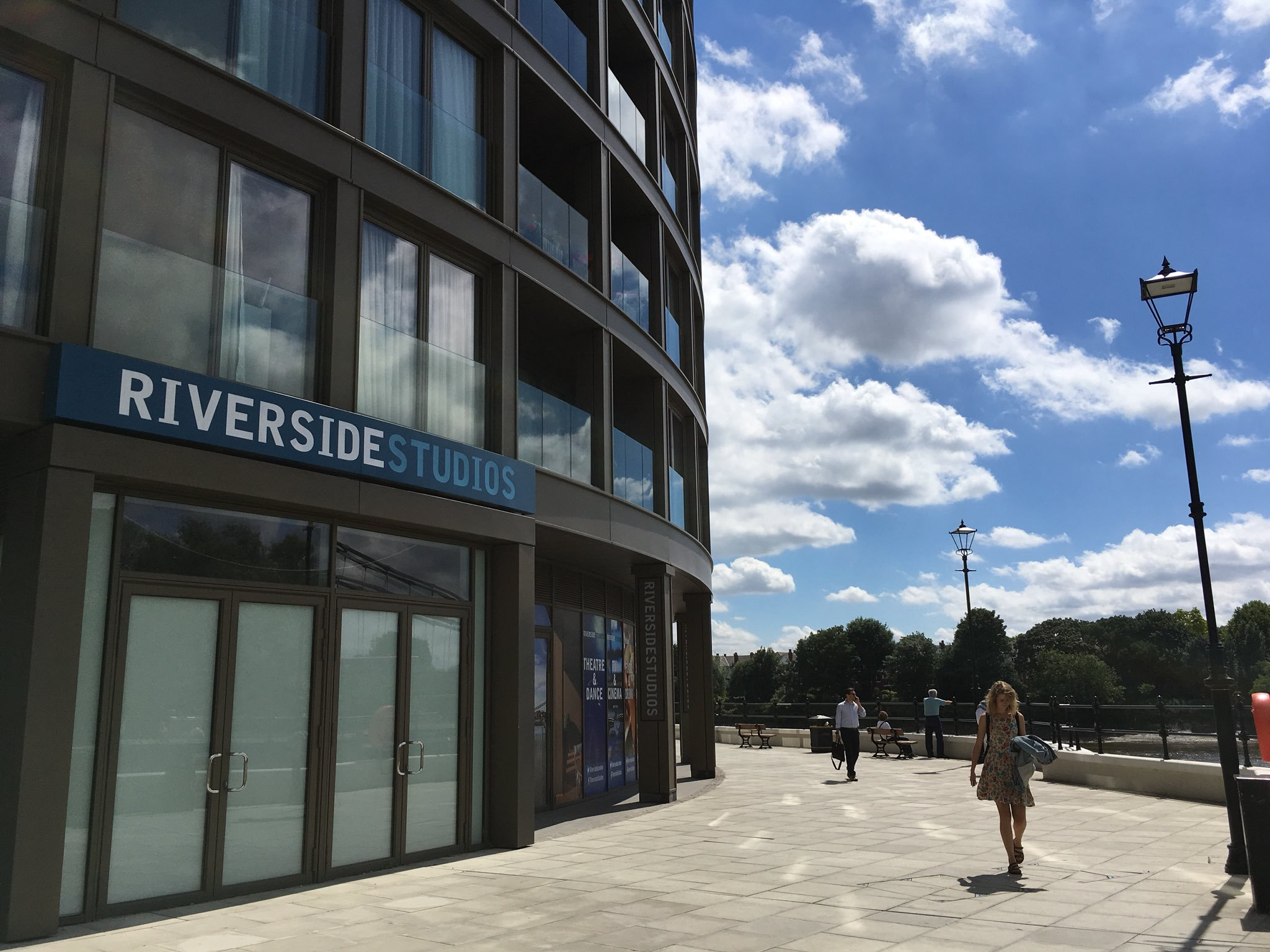
- Interactive map of Riverside Studios
- Location: Hammersmith; London, W6; England
- Owner: Anil Agarwal Riverside Studios Trust
- Type: Arts Centre, Cinema, Television studio
- Production: Celebrity Juice, The Apprentice: You're Fired!, The York Realist, The Last Leg
- Public transit: Hammersmith (District/Piccadilly); Hammersmith (Circle/Hammersmith & City)

Construction
- Opened: 1976–2014 / 2019–

Website
- riversidestudios.co.uk

Riverside Studios is an arts centre on the north bank of the River Thames in Hammersmith, London, England. The venue plays host to contemporary performance, film, visual art exhibitions and television production.

Having opened in May 1976, the original building closed for redevelopment in September 2014. A new Riverside Studios reopened on its original site in August 2019. In March 2023, the Riverside Trust announced it was placing the theatre into administration because of debt incurred. In January 2025, it was announced that Riverside Studios had been purchased and will be operated by the Anil Agarwal Riverside Studios Trust.

== Film studios 1933–1954 ==
In 1933, a former Victorian iron foundry on Crisp Road, London, was bought by Triumph Films and converted into a relatively compact film studio with two sound stages and a dubbing theatre. In 1935, the studios were taken over by Julius Hagen (then owner of Twickenham Studios) with the idea of using Riverside for making quota quickies. However, by 1937 his company had gone into liquidation. Between 1937 and 1946, the studios were owned by Jack Buchanan and produced such films as We'll Meet Again (1943) with Vera Lynn and The Seventh Veil (1945) with James Mason. In 1946 the studios were acquired by Alliance Film Studios (then owners of Twickenham Studios and Southall Studios) and produced films including They Made Me a Fugitive (1948) with Trevor Howard, The Happiest Days of Your Life (1950) with Alistair Sim and Margaret Rutherford and Father Brown (1954) with Alec Guinness.

== BBC Television studios 1954–1974 ==
In 1954, the studios were acquired by the British Broadcasting Corporation for its television service. Renamed The BBC Riverside Television Studios, the building was officially opened on 29 March 1957 by Queen Elizabeth The Queen Mother. Series 2 to 6 of Hancock's Half Hour (1957–1960) were made there, along with other comedy, drama and music programmes, including the science-fiction serial Quatermass and the Pit (1958–1959), Dixon of Dock Green, Six-Five Special, The Old Grey Whistle Test, Z-Cars, Top of the Pops (1965), and the children's programmes Blue Peter and Play School. (1964–1968) Episodes of Doctor Who were made at Riverside between 1964 and 1968, and Studio 1 was where First Doctor William Hartnell's regeneration scene was filmed. The facility remained in regular use until the BBC left in 1974.

== Riverside Studios 1974–2014 ==
In 1974, a charitable trust formed by Hammersmith and Fulham Council took control of the building, and two large multi-purpose spaces designed by Michael Reardon were created from the studio's two main sound stages. While preparing Riverside's opening festival in 1976, the venue's first Artistic Director Peter Gill permitted an amateur West London music group called The Strand to use one of the performance spaces to rehearse. They went on to become The Sex Pistols. Riverside's original policy was to have a combination of in-house and visiting company productions of classical and contemporary plays and dance. Running concurrently with the main programme were regular events and activities including a film, music, education, workshop and play reading programme. David Gothard, the founding programming director, brought "The Dead Class" by Tadeusz Kantor and the Cricot 2 company from Kraków in Poland in 1977.

Riverside Studios became fully operational in 1978 with Gill's landmark production of The Cherry Orchard. The venue quickly acquired an international reputation for excellence and innovation with productions including The Changeling with Brian Cox and Robert Lindsay (1978), Measure for Measure with Helen Mirren (1979) and Julius Caesar with Phil Daniels (1980), as well as a variety of international work – including, notably, that of Polish theatre maestro Tadeusz Kantor. In 1978, Riverside hosted the first of many Dance Umbrella seasons, featuring the work of Rosemary Butcher and Richard Alston. Gill also offered residencies to artists including Bruce McLean and Ian Caughlin and companies such as the Black Theatre Co-operative (now NitroBeat). The venue was also used by the BBC for some television recording, including a 1979 episode of Parkinson for which host Michael Parkinson interviewed former United States Secretary of State Henry Kissinger.

Art exhibitions (including Prints by Howard Hodgkin, 1978) had initially been curated by Milena Kalinovska in Riverside's foyer, but following Gill's departure in 1980, a purpose-built gallery space was established by the resident architect Will Alsop and John Lyall along with technical director Steven Scott. The directorship of Jenny Stein established the first exhibition and showed works by the painter and graphic artist Edvard Munch. Subsequent exhibitions included David Hockney (Paintings and Drawings for Parade, 1981), Antony Gormley (New Sculpture, 1984), Louise Bourgeois (Recent Work, 1990) and Yoko Ono (In Facing, 1990). In 1985, Kalinovska (who was Riverside's Exhibitions Director from 1982 to 1986) was nominated for The Turner Prize.

From 1980, David Gothard directed the performing arts program and invited Michael Clark to become Riverside's first resident choreographer. He made 16 original pieces at the studios before establishing his own dance company in 1984. Also in 1980, Samuel Beckett directed the San Quentin Theatre Workshop's rehearsals of his play Endgame in Studio 2, returning to Riverside four years later to direct the same company in Waiting for Godot. Under Gothard's direction, there were performances by Dario Fo and Franca Rame, Le Cirque Imaginaire, Eckehard Scall and the Berliner Ensemble, the Market Theatre (Johannesburg), Cricot 2 of Kraków, Collectivo De Parma, and independent dance collaborations with Merce Cunningham and John Cage and members of the Judson Church.

In November 1987, a 200-seat cinema was opened by the actress Vanessa Redgrave.

In 1990, jazz veteran Adelaide Hall starred in the movie Sophisticated Lady, a documentary about her life, which included a performance of her in concert recorded live at Riverside Studios.

William Burdett-Coutts (also Artistic Director of Assembly) was appointed Artistic Director of Riverside Studios in 1993 (a position he held until June 2020). While Riverside continued its multi-arts programming (hosting companies such as Complicité, The Wooster Group and Howard Barker's The Wrestling School), its 200-seat cinema was celebrated for its double bill programmes and the variety of international film festivals which took place annually.

In 1996, television production returned to Riverside when TFI Friday with Chris Evans took up residence in Studio 1 (until 2000). CD:UK was broadcast from Riverside between 2003 and 2006, while later TV projects included Channel 4's T4 (2006–2009), Popworld and The Last Leg, BBC's Never Mind the Buzzcocks and ITV's Celebrity Juice (2008–2014).

In September 2014, Riverside Studios closed for redevelopment.

== Redevelopment 2014–2019 ==
London developer Mount Anvil, working in conjunction with A2 Dominion, redeveloped Riverside Studios and the adjacent Queen's Wharf building. Assael Architecture, were employed to design a new building on the site centred around 165 residential flats, with new studio facilities for theatre and television, two cinemas, a riverside restaurant and café/bar as well as flexible event spaces. As part of the redevelopment, a new riverside walkway connects to the Thames Path alongside the late Victorian Hammersmith Bridge.

During the redevelopment, Riverside continued to produce shows including Nirbhaya by Yael Farber at international venues including the Southbank Centre and the Lynn Redgrave Theatre (2015), Raz, a new play by Jim Cartwright at Trafalgar Studios (2016) and A Christmas Carol with Simon Callow at the Arts Theatre (2016–17).

== Riverside Studios 2019–present ==
Riverside Studios reopened to the public in late 2019.

Since then, its stages have hosted such figures as Woody Harrelson, Helen Mirren, Benjamin Zephaniah, Eddie Izzard, Roger McGough, Lenny Henry, Andy Serkis, Jenna Russell, Jimmy Carr, Sir Trevor Nunn, Jack Dee, Louisa Harland, Tom Allen, KT Tunstall, Sanjeev Bhaskar, Sharon Gless and Dane Baptiste. Meanwhile, performance and rehearsal spaces within the building have been used by a range of community groups and theatre companies including Flute Theatre, who run creative projects for young people with autism, and Riverside's founding artistic director Peter Gill (playwright), who returned in 2022 to rehearse his latest play Something in the Air.

Since 2020, the long-running television panel show Have I Got News for You has been recorded in Studio 1 with a variety of guests including Sue Perkins, Angela Rippon, Phil Wang and Diane Morgan. In the same studio in 2020 and 2021, the BBC also recorded the Christmas and New Year Specials of Top of the Pops. In 2021, Olly Alexander recorded their New Year's Eve concert in Studio 1, with special guests Kylie Minogue and the Pet Shop Boys.

In March 2023 the theatre trust announced that the venue was being placed in administration because of the debt incurred by the redevelopment, coupled with increased operating expenses and a reduced revenue stream. The studios operated as normal during the administration process.

On 8 January 2025, it was announced that Indian businessman Anil Agarwal had purchased Riverside Studios for an undisclosed sum. The studios are now operated by the Anil Agarwal Riverside Studios Trust.

Riverside presented the stage debuts of Sex Education actor Asa Butterfield in Second Best in January 2025 and Stranger Things star Noah Schnapp in Affluenza in September 2026.

In 2026, Riverside Studios celebrated the fiftieth anniversary of its opening as an arts centre with a season of special events referencing some of the productions and luminaries that helped to shape Riverside's history. These included 'In Conversation' events with Dame Helen Mirren, Sir Lenny Henry, Robert Lindsay, Gyles Brandreth, Simon Callow, Lindsay Duncan and the cast of BBC sketch show Goodness Gracious Me. Events celebrating TFI Friday and Top of the Pops, featuring key members of their production teams, were also programmed.

=== Facilities ===
- Studio 1 - 6,500 sq ft (600 m^{2}) HD and UHD studio with audience seating for 368 (capacity of 468), Operated by Riverside TV with links to BT Tower
- Studio 2 - 5,077 sq ft (471.7 m^{2}) multi-use black-box studio with audience capacity of 400
- Studio 3 - 1,800 sq ft (170 m^{2}) primarily theatre studio with audience capacity of 180
- River Room - flexible events space offering river views with capacity of 100
- Rehearsal Room - rehearsal/community space with capacity of 60
- Screen 1 - Cinema auditorium with capacity of 210
- Screen 2 - Screening Room with capacity of 45
- Riverside Bar & Kitchen - bar and restaurant with interior and exterior tables offerings river views

== Selected television productions ==
- TFI Friday (1996 - 2000)
- Top of the Pops (including 1965, 2001, 2014, 2020, 2021)
- CD:UK (2003 - 2006)
- T4 (2006 - 2009)
- Celebrity Juice (2008 - 2014)
- The Apprentice: You're Fired! (2008 - 2014, 2019 - Present)
- Russell Howard's Good News (2009 - 2014)
- The Last Leg (2012 - 2014, 2022)
- Never Mind the Buzzcocks (2013)
- Have I Got News for You (2020 - Present)
- Strictly Come Dancing: It Takes Two (2021)
- Jools' Annual Hootenanny (2021, 2022)
- NFL: Big Game Night (2025)

== Selected theatre productions ==
- The Cherry Orchard, with Julie Covington, Caroline Langrishe and Judy Parfitt (1978)
- The Ragged Trousered Philanthropists by Joint Stock. Directed by William Gaskill (1978)
- St. Mark's Gospel – devised, directed and performed by Alec McCowen (1978)
- The Changeling by Thomas Middleton, with Brian Cox, Robert Lindsay and David Troughton (1979)
- Measure for Measure by William Shakespeare, with Helen Mirren, George Morris Baker and Michael Elphick (1979)
- Mama Dragon by Black Theatre Co-operative (1980)
- A Moon for the Misbegotten, with Frances de la Tour. Directed by David Leveaux (1983)
- The Biko Inquest, with Albert Finney, Nigel Davenport, and Michael Gough (1984)
- The Dance of Death, with Alan Bates, Michael Byrne, and Frances de la Tour (1985), from August Strindberg
- Playing the Right Tune by Benjamin Zephaniah (1985)
- The Life of Napoleon written by and starring John Sessions. Directed by Kenneth Branagh (1987)
- Twelfth Night, with Richard Briers and Caroline Langrishe. Directed by Kenneth Branagh (1988)
- The Pornography of Performance by The Sydney Front (1989)
- Hamlet, with Alan Rickman and Geraldine McEwan (1992)
- The Seven Streams of the River Ota by Robert Lepage (1994)
- Antony and Cleopatra, with Vanessa Redgrave (1994)
- Jump to Cow Heaven, with Martin Freeman (1997)
- Mnemonic by Complicité (2003)
- Phèdre, with Sheila Gish. Directed by Deborah Warner (2002)
- Scaramouche Jones, with Pete Postlethwaite (2002)
- The Exonerated, with Stockard Channing, Aidan Quinn, Danny Glover and Alanis Morissette. Directed by Bob Balaban (2006)
- Spectacular by Forced Entertainment (2008)
- 1800 Acres by David Myers, with Cathy Tyson (2008)
- The New Electric Ballroom by Enda Walsh (2009)
- Windmill Baby (winner of the Patrick White Playwrights' Award) by David Milroy and Ningali Lawford (2009)
- Salad Days by Tête à Tête (2010/11 and 2012/13)
- Troilus and Cressida by The Wooster Group and The Royal Shakespeare Company (2010)
- A Round-Heeled Woman: the play, with Sharon Gless (2011)
- Mies Julie, adapted from August Strindberg's Miss Julie by Yaël Farber (2013)
- Love, Loss & Chianti with Robert Bathurst (2020)
- Happy Days by Samuel Beckett. Directed by Trevor Nunn (June–July 2021)
- Great Expectations by Charles Dickens, performed by Eddie Izzard (February 2022)
- Operation Mincemeat, presented by SpitLip (May–July 2022)
- An Evening with Benjamin Zephaniah (March 2023)
- Flowers for Mrs Harris, with Jenna Russell (October–November 2023)
- Ulster American by David Ireland, with Woody Harrelson, Andy Serkis, and Louisa Harland. Directed by Jeremy Herrin (December 2023–January 2024)
- Second Best by Barney Norris, with Asa Butterfield (January–March 2025)
- Interview with Robert Sean Leonard (August-September 2025)
- Affluenza, Sacrilegious, Expecting, directed by Andy Sandberg and all part of the Mainstage Season 26/27.

== Selected dance productions ==
- Dance Umbrella (first London Dance Umbrella festival staged at Riverside and the Institute of Contemporary Arts in 1978)
- Empty Signals by Rosemary Butcher (1978)
- Rush by Michael Clark (1982)
- Set & Reset by Trisha Brown (1983)
- Of Shadows and Walls by Rosemary Butcher (1991)
- Twyla Tharp (1994)
- Stormforce by Rophin Vianney (2006)
- Episodes of Light by Rosemary Butcher (2008)
- Mamootot by Batsheva Dance Company (2008)
- Havana Rumba by Toby Gough (2009)
- Circa (contemporary circus) (2009)
- Dancing on Your Grave by Lea Anderson's The Cholmondeleys and The Featherstonehaughs (2009)
- At Swim Two Boys by Earthfall Dance (2012)
- Chelsea Hotel by Earthfall Dance (2013)

== Selected live comedy shows ==
- Lenny Henry (1988)
- Peter Sellers Is Dead with Sanjeev Bhaskar, Nina Wadia, Kulvinder Ghir and Meera Syal. A precursor to the BBC radio and TV series' Goodness Gracious Me (BBC) (1995)
- Ed Byrne: Me Again (2004) and Different Class (2008)
- Bill Bailey: Tinselworm (2007)
- Pappy's: Funergy (2009)
- Richard Herring: The Twelve Tasks of Hercules Terrace (2009)
- Julian Clary (2010)
- Rhod Gilbert
- Count Arthur Strong: The Man Behind the Smile
- Dane Baptiste (2023)
- Live Next to the Apollo, with acts including Marcus Brigstocke, Sindhu Vee, Ian Stone, Nabil Abdulrashid and Nathan Caton (2023–)

== Selected music performances ==
- Toyah (18 July 1979)
- New Order (4 January 1982)
- Sigue Sigue Sputnik (24 July 1985)
- Van Morrison and The Chieftains (1988)
- David Bowie (8 September 2003)
- Annie Lennox (2003)
- Pink (2003)
- Metallica (2003)
- Amy Winehouse (10 February 2008)
- Stereophonics (2008)
- Tom Robinson hosted live recording sessions in Studio 3 for his BBC Radio 6 Music radio show, show Introducing... (2009)
- Kelis (2010)

== Photos ==
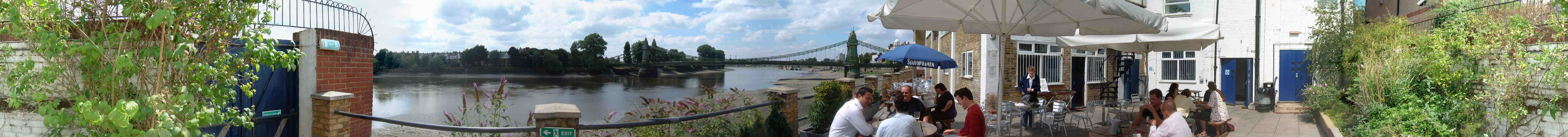
Panorama of the terrace at the original Riverside Studios
