= Mark Lorimer =

British dancer and choreographer

Mark Lorimer is a British dancer and choreographer, best known for his work with the Brussels-based choreographers Anne Teresa De Keersmaeker and Thomas Hauert.

== Early life and education ==
Mark Lorimer was a student at the London Contemporary Dance School, and graduated in 1991.

== Dance career ==
After that, he joined the dance company The Featherstonehaughs (a sister company of The Cholmondeleys) of choreographer Lea Anderson. Until 1993, he worked with them on various stage art projects, but also on films, local projects and an adaptation of Pasolini's Teorema with theatre and opera director Lucy Bailey.

In 1993, he moved to Brussels to work with the Compagnie Michèle Anne De Mey on Pulcinella, a dance production with a live version of the Italian Suite from Igor Stravinsky's Pulcinella.

=== Collaboration with Anne Teresa De Keersmaeker / Rosas ===
His most important (and longest) collaboration, however, was the one he started with Anne Teresa De Keersmaeker / Rosas in 1994. From Amor constante, más allá de la muerte (Anne Teresa De Keersmaeker / Rosas, 1994) to En Atendant (Anne Teresa De Keersmaeker / Rosas, 2010) he danced in ten new productions. He also performed in restagings of Bartók / Mikrokosmos (Anne Teresa De Keersmaeker / Rosas, 1987), Kinok (Anne Teresa De Keersmaeker / Rosas, 1994) and Mozart / Concert Arias. Unmoto di gioia. (Anne Teresa De Keersmaeker / Rosas, 1992), and was a repetitor on In real time (Anne Teresa De Keersmaeker / Rosas, TG Stan and AKA Moon, 2000) and Vortex Temporum (Anne Teresa De Keersmaeker / Rosas, 2013). In 2009, Lorimer, with Rosas dancer Cynthia Loemij, also performed a choreography by Anne Teresa De Keersmaeker on Prélude à l'après-midi d'un faune by Claude Debussy for the film Prelude à la Mer by Thierry De Mey.

=== Collaboration with Thomas Hauert / ZOO ===
Another important collaboration of Lorimer was that between 1997 and 2005 with Thomas Hauert / ZOO. He danced in six new productions of the dance company, from Cows in Space (Thomas Hauert / ZOO, 1998) to Modify (Thomas Hauert / ZOO, 2004). For 5 (Thomas Hauert, Lorimer, Sara Ludi, Samantha van Wissen and Mat Voorter / ZOO, 2003) the various then core members of the company created their own choreographies. For Lorimer, that was Nylon solution, a collaboration with Chrysa Parkinson.

=== Own choreographies ===
In addition to Nylon solution, Lorimer has created some other own choreographies. Based on a duet with Cynthia Loemij, Lorimer made the video installation Mirror Modulation for the exhibition The Time That Is Left by artist Manon de Boer at the Frankfurter Kunstverein. His best known choreographies are the two choreographies he created with Cynthia Loemij: Dancesmith - Camel, Wheat, Whale (Cynthia Loemij and Lorimer, 2013) and To Intimate (Cynthia Loemij and Lorimer, 2011). These productions toured in Belgium, France, Luxembourg and Switzerland. He created To Intimate (Cynthia Loemij and Lorimer, 2011) for Ovaal vzw, a Brussels dance organization he founded together with Cynthia Loemij. His most recent choreography is Darwin's Gypsy Dance (Lorimer, 2016), that he created for five members of BODHI PROJECT, a dance company for postgraduate students at SEAD, the Salzburg Experimental Academy of Dance. In 2021 he will choreograph a new piece for eight dancers for the ADC in Geneva to open the La Bâtie Festival - “Canon and on and on...”

=== Collaboration with others ===
In addition, Lorimer also collaborated as a dancer with other choreographers: Lea Anderson, Bock and Vincenzi, Mia Lawrence, Jonathan Burrows, Deborah Hay, Alix Eynaudi, Marten Spangberg, Kris Verdonck, Alain Buffard and Boris Charmatz.

== Teaching ==
Lorimer also regularly teaches at P.A.R.T.S. (Brussels), ImPulsTanz - Vienna International Dance Festival (Vienna), The Laban Centre (London), London Contemporary Dance School, Panetta Movement Center (New York), Movement Research (New York) and Manufacture (Lausanne).

== Productions ==
Own work:

- To Intimate (Cynthia Loemij and Lorimer, 2011)
- Dancesmith - camel, weasel, whale (Cynthia Loemij and Lorimer, 2013)
- Darwin’s Gypsy Dance (Lorimer, 2016)

With Anne Teresa De Keersmaeker / Rosas:

- Amor constante, más allá de la muerte (Anne Teresa De Keersmaeker / Rosas, 1994)
- Erwartung / Verklärte Nacht (Anne Teresa De Keersmaeker / Rosas, 1995)
- Woud, three movements to the music of Berg, Schönberg & Wagner (Anne Teresa De Keersmaeker / Rosas, 1996)
- Repertory Evening (Anne Teresa De Keersmaeker / Rosas, 2002)
- D'un soir un jour (Anne Teresa De Keersmaeker / Rosas, 2006)
- Bartók / Beethoven / Schönberg Repertory Evening (Anne Teresa De Keersmaeker / Rosas, 2006)
- Steve Reich Evening (Anne Teresa De Keersmaeker / Rosas, 2007)
- Zeitung (Anne Teresa De Keersmaeker / Rosas en Alain Franco, 2008)
- The Song (Anne Teresa De Keersmaeker / Rosas, Ann Veronica Janssens en Michel François, 2009)
- En Atendant (Anne Teresa De Keersmaeker / Rosas, 2010)
- “The Six Brandenburger Concertos” (Anne-Teresa De Keersmaeker/Rosas, 2018)

Lorimer also participated as a dancer in restagings of Bartók / Mikrokosmos (Anne Teresa De Keersmaeker / Rosas, 1987), Kinok (Anne Teresa De Keersmaeker / Rosas, 1994) and Mozart / Concert Arias. Un moto di gioia. (Anne Teresa De Keersmaeker/Rosas, 1992). He was a repetitor on In real time (Anne Teresa De Keersmaeker / Rosas, tg stan and AKA Moon, 2000) and Vortex Temporum (Anne Teresa De Keersmaeker / Rosas, 2013).

With Thomas Hauert / ZOO:

- Cows in space (Thomas Hauert / ZOO, 1998)
- Pop-Up Songbook (Thomas Hauert / ZOO, 1999)
- Jetzt (Thomas Hauert /ZOO, 2000)
- Verosimile (Thomas Hauert / ZOO, 2002)
- 5 (Thomas Hauert, Lorimer, Sara Ludi, Samantha van Wissen and Mat Voorter / ZOO, 2003)
- Modify (Thomas Hauert/ZOO, 2004)

With Alix Eynaudi:

- Monique (Alix Eynaudi, 2012)
- Edelweiss (Alix Eynaudi, 2015)

With others:

- Pulcinella (Compagnie Michèle Anne De Mey, 1994)
- Schreibstück - Version Jonathan Burrows (Thomas Lehmen, 2002-2004)
- The Match (Deborah Hay / The Deborah Hay Dance Company, 2004)
- manger (Boris Charmatz / Musée de la danse, 2014)
- 20 Dancers for the XX Century ((Boris Charmatz / Musée de la danse, in: Museo Nacional Centro de Arte Reina Sofía, 2016)
- Gerhard Richter, une pièce pour le théâtre (Mårten Spångberg, 2017)

== Sources ==
- Kunstenpunt - Persons – Mark Lorimer according to the Flemish Arts Institute
- Vimeo channel of Thomas Hauert / ZOO
