= Ludi (disambiguation) =

Ludi may refer to:

- Ludo, board game called "Ludi" in the Caribbean
- Ludi (comics), in the Marvel Universe, a demon who has clashed with Doctor Strange.
- Ludi, games presented as part of ancient Roman religious festivals, Latin plural of ludus
- Ludi (surname)

== See also ==
- Lüdi
- Ludus (disambiguation)
