= Hans Van den Broeck =

Belgian dancer, choreographer and video artist

Hans Van den Broeck is a Belgian dancer, choreographer and video artist who is best known for his productions for les ballets C de la B and SOIT.

== Training ==
Hans Van den Broeck studied psychology at the KU Leuven in the 80's. While studying in Leuven, he also participated in workshops with choreographers and theater makers (amongst others with Jan Fabre) at the art centre STUC, that was often frequented by the big names of contemporary dance. Subsequently, he studied film at the City University of New York.

== Choreographic work for les ballets C de la B ==
After returning to Belgium he auditioned for Alain Platel and danced in several of his productions. He became one of the choreographers of les ballets C de la B. That collective expanded into an artistic platform for various choreographers: Koen Augustijnen, Sidi Larbi Cherkaoui, Christine De Smedt, Lisi Estaras, Alain Platel, Fred Toffer and Hans Van den Broeck. For les ballets C de la B he made a series of productions that toured international: How to approach a dog (Hans Van den Broeck / les ballets C de la B, 1992), Everyman (Hans Van den Broeck / les ballets C de la B, 1994), (They Feed, We) Eat, Eat, Eat (Hans Van den Broeck / les ballets C de la B, 1996), Au Progrès (Hans Van den Broeck / les ballets C de la B, 1998), La Sortie (Hans Van den Broeck / les ballets C de la B, 1999), Induced Sleep (Hans Van den Broeck / les ballets C de la B, 2000) and Lac des Singes (Hans Van den Broeck / les ballets C de la B, 2001). In these physical works of ‘dance-theatre’ that are strongly influenced by Jan Fabre's work, the stubbornness in communication and the boundary between reality and fiction are recurring themes. Productions as La sortie (Hans Van den Broeck / les ballets C de la B, 1999) and Lac des Singes (Hans Van den Broeck / les ballets C de la B, 2001) investigate animality and cruelty, psychological aspects that people develop mainly in groups.

The Norwegian choreographer, dancer and performance artist Mette Edvardsen collaborated with Hans Van den Broeck before she started developing her own work. She was a performer in (They feed we) Eat, eat, eat (Hans Van den Broeck / les ballets C de la B, 1996), Au Progrès (Hans Van den Broeck / les ballets C de la B, 1997), La sortie (Hans Van den Broeck / les ballets C de la B, 1999) and assisted director / choreographer Hans Van den Broeck on Lac des singes (Hans Van den Broeck / les ballets C de la B, 2001).

== Choreographic work for SOIT ==
In 2002 he left les ballets C de la B. He founded his own performing arts company SOIT, that is based in Brussels. SOIT is an abbreviation for Stay Only If Temporary. The company works with various stage artists and dancers. Its composition varies for each production. Hans Van den Broeck's main productions for the company are Almost Dark (2004), En Servicio '(2006), We were them (2009) and Messiah Run! (2012). In addition, there are also a series of other productions, including Deed of Arrangement (2003), Durchgang (2005) and Café Prückel (2010). One of his latest productions is The Lee Ellroy Show (Hans Van den Broeck / SOIT, 2014), inspired by the novel My Dark Places, in which the American author James Ellroy describes the emotional impact of the unsolved murder of his mother Jean. This production and other recent productions (e.g., Celestial Commute (Hans Van den Broeck / SOIT, 2015) and the open improv evenings Roseland 2013, Roseland 2014 and Roseland 2017 (all Hans Van den Broeck / SOIT) are made in co-production or in collaboration with les Brigittines - Contemporary Arts Centre for Movement, Brussels. Hans van den Broeck himself describes his work as raw, visceral, uncompromising, committed, suggestive, poetic, visual and cinematographic. His interest lies in creating both multidisciplinary performing arts and video projects. He also regularly conducts workshops, which he himself calls 'workshows' because they usually result in a public performance in a professional environment. Cooperation and exploration are central. Together they form a trilogy, consisting of Settlement, Nomads, and Homeland.

== Work as an audiovisual artist ==
Hans van den Broeck directed several semi-fiction videos, such as Eyes on the back (1998), Ways of watching (1998), Odeur de Sainteté (2003), Alivetoo (2008) and Homeland (2011). His video Our Circumscribed Days (2000), a rhythmic portrait of Moscow, won the Prix du Jury at the festival Entrainements #4 in Paris in 2003. The video was shown in Brussels in 2001 at the Kunstenfestivaldesarts, and in 2017 at Argos, centre for art and media (as part of the program STEP UP! Belgian Dance and Performance on Camera 1970-2000 Chapter 3.

== Performing arts productions ==
For SOIT:

- Deed of Arrangement (Hans Van den Broeck, 2003)
- Almost Dark (Hans Van den Broeck, 2004)
- Durchgang (Ellen Meijer and Hans Van den Broeck, 2005)
- En Servicio (Hans Van den Broeck, 2006)
- We Was Them (Hans Van den Broeck, 2009)
- Café Prückel (Hans Van den Broeck, 2010)
- Messiah Run! (Hans Van den Broeck, 2012)
- Tre Systrar (Mellika Melouani Mellani, Hans Van den Broeck and Anuschka Von Oppen, 2013)
- Café Italo-belge (Sarah Bleasdale, Stanislav Dobak, Julio Cesar Iglesias, Jamie Lee, Hans Van den Broeck and Anuschka Von Oppen, 2013)
- Roadrage (Jake Ingram-Dodd, Hans Van den Broeck and Anuschka Von Oppen, 2014)
- The Lee Ellroy Show (Jake Ingram-Dodd, Hans Van den Broeck and Anuschka Von Oppen, 2014)
- Celestial Commute (Hans Van den Broeck, 2015)

For les ballets C de la B:

- Alchemie (Alain Platel, 1987)
- O Boom (Alain Platel, 1989)
- Mussen (Alain Platel, 1991)
- How to approach a dog (Hans Van den Broeck, 1992)
- Bonjour madame, comment allez-vous aujourd'hui, il fait beau, Il va sans doute pleuvoir, ... (Alain Platel, 1993)
- Everyman (Hans Van den Broeck, 1994)
- (They Feed, We) Eat, Eat, Eat (Hans Van den Broeck, 1996)
- Iets op Bach (Alain Platel, 1998)
- Au progrès (Hans Van den Broeck, 1998)
- La Sortie (Hans Van den Broeck, 1999)
- Induced Sleep (Hans Van den Broeck, 2000)
- Lac des Singes (Hans Van den Broeck, 2001)

== Workshows ==
- Settlement Sydney (2007)
- Nomads (2008)
- Settlement Harare (2008)
- Settlement Bastia (2008)
- Settlement Vienna (2008)
- Settlement Wellington (2008)
- Homeland (2011-2013)
- Settlement Los Angeles (2014)

== Videos and installations ==
For SOIT:

- Odeur de Sainteté (Hans Van den Broeck, 2003)
- Alivetoo (Hans Van den Broeck, 2007)

For les ballets C de la B:

- Ways of Watching (Sikay Tang and Hans Van den Broeck, 1998)
- Eyes on the back (Yves Opstaele and Hans Van den Broeck, 2000)
- Our Circumscribed Days (Hans Van den Broeck, 2001)

== Sources ==
- Website of SOIT
- YouTube channel of SOIT
- Kunstenpunt - Persons - Hans Van den Broeck according to the Flemish Arts Institute
- Kunstenpunt - Performing Arts in Flanders - Producers - SOIT according to the Flemish Arts Institute
