= Salva Sanchis =

Salva (Salvador) Sanchis is a Spanish dancer, choreographer and dance teacher.

== Training ==
Salva Sanchis was born in Manresa, a city near Barcelona. He followed a theater training at Barcelona's Institut del Teatre, where he specialized in physical theatre, mime techniques, sword fighting, acrobatics and Aikido. In 1995, he moved to Belgium to study in Brussels at P.A.R.T.S., the dance school founded by Anne Teresa De Keersmaeker. There he created various dance solo and group choreographies. His graduation project Less than a moment, a one-hour choreography for five dancers, was performed at different places in Europe. Salva Sanchis graduated from P.A.R.T.S in 1998 with the first generation of students. On the occasion of the twentieth anniversary of the dance school, he co-ordinated with the dancer / choreographer Heine Avdal the program P.A.R.T.S. Generation 1 (1995-1998) that was presented at the Brussels Beursschouwburg in November 2015.

== Initial period ==
From 1998, his work evolved from a theater-influenced style to a pronounced abstract approach to dance. In particular, his choreography Previous (2003), again a piece for five dancers, marked that change of direction to a more abstract language and an in-depth study of improvisation. In addition to his choreographies, Salva collaborated in the period 2000-2004 regularly with choreographer Marc Vanrunxt (on his productions Performance and Most Recent), video artist Elke Vandermeerschen and visual artist Kristof Van Gestel. With Marc Vanrunxt he also collaborated afterwards.

== Collaboration with Anne Teresa De Keersmaeker / Rosas ==
From 2002 to 2007, Salva Sanchis was associated with Anne Teresa De Keersmaeker’s dance company Rosas. He started as a dancer in Bitches Brew / Tacoma Narrows (Anne Teresa De Keersmaeker / Rosas, 2003). For Cassandra - speaking in twelve voices (Anne Teresa De Keersmaeker / Rosas, 2004), he collaborated on the dance vocabulary, but did not participate as a dancer in production. For the two productions that followed, Raga for the Rainy Season / A Love Supreme (Anne Teresa De Keersmaeker / Rosas, 2005) and Desh (Anne Teresa De Keersmaeker / Rosas, 2005) he was, together with Anne Teressa De Keersmaeker, responsible for part of the choreography and dance vocabulary (A Love Supreme in the first production and Raaj Khamaj and India in the second). Salva Sanchis also participated as a dancer in these two productions. A Love Supreme was restaged by Salva Sanchis and Rosas in 2017 in a revised version. While he was associated with Rosas, he also produced some of his own choreographies: Double Trio Live (2005), Variations in G (2006) and Still Live (2007).

In the period that Salva Sanchis was associated with Rosas, his work was determined by research guided by musical sources. By working with jazz music, he developed a personal approach to the relationship between dance and music. After that, music (often live music) remained an important element in his choreographic work. He worked with musicians such as jazz saxophonist Bruno Vansina, avant-garde jazz pianist / composer Kris Defoort, organist / composer Bernard Foccroulle, sound artist Peter Lenaerts, pianist Yutaka Oya and the duo Discodesafinado, that mixes minimal techno with experimental electronics. With Bernard Fouccroulle, Salva Sanchis created from 2008 under the title The Organ Project a series of dance shows with live organ music in different churches in Europe that have evolved into improvisations for four to five dancers. With Kris Defoort, he made the improvisation solo Action in 2010.

== Latent Fuss and cooperation with kunst/werk ==
After Salva Sanchis left Rosas, a short period followed in which he started his own organization (Latent Fuss vzw) to produce his transition work Objects in mirror are closer than they appear (2008). This is a production for four dancers and a musician that confronts pure movement with extraterrestrial abductions, Out of Body Experiences (OBE) and developments in cognitive neurology. In 2010, he switched to kunst/werk, a Belgian subsidized dance organization where he is responsible for artistic leadership together with Marc Vanrunxt. He produced choreographies such as Now here (2011), Angle (2012), The Phantom Layer (2013), Islands (2014) and Radical Light (2016). Angle and Radical Light are also performances in which music plays a crucial role. Angle is a solo in collaboration with pianist Yutaka Oya, who plays short compositions of György Ligeti, John Cage, Luciano Berio, Jo Kondo and Keiko Harada. For Radical Light, Salva Sanchis began a dialogue with the music of Discodesafinado (Senjan Jansen and Joris Vermeiren), resulting in a choreography that was completely based on the musical concept of 'pulse'.

== Return to Spain ==
In the first months of 2016, it became known that, after a stay of more than twenty years in Brussels, Salva Sanchis returned to his native region in Spain to complete his studies in psychology. In the meantime, he only wants to restage older choreographic work. The return to Spain also means his departure from kunst/werk.

== Reception of choreographic work ==
The choreographies that Salva Sanchis has created for kunst/werk and Latent Fuss vzw have toured in Belgium and abroad, especially Radical Light (Salva Sanchis, 2016), Islands (Salva Sanchis, 2014) and Objects in mirror are closer than they appear (Salva Sanchis, 2008). In Belgium (mainly in Flanders and Brussels), they were performed in the main theatres (Kaaitheater in Brussels, art centre STUK in Leuven, Monty and deSingel in Antwerp, Vooruit in Ghent, Concertgebouw in Bruges and art centre BUDA in Kortrijk), but also in cultural centres in smaller cities. Outside Belgium they were performed in Austria (Vienna), France (Lyon, Villeneuve D'ascq and Valenciennes), Hungary (Budapest), Italy (Firenze), the Netherlands (Rotterdam), Portugal (Lisbon) and Spain (Barcelona and Santiago de Compostela). In 2017, Radical Light was selected for the Flemish TheaterFestival. In 2018, Radical Light (Salva Sanchis, 2016) will be performed for six days at the Théâtre de la Bastille in Paris.

The revised version of A Love Supreme (Salva Sanchis and Anne Teresa De Keersmaeker / Rosas, 2017) has even toured more intensely, with performances in Austria, Belgium, France, Germany and Italy since its premiere in April 2017. In 2017 and 2018, more performances will follow in Belgium, France, Hungary, Italy, the Netherlands, Spain, Switzerland and the United States. In 2017, the Rosas dancers José Paulo dos Santos, Bilal El Had, Jason Respilieux and Thomas Vantuycom were awarded the prix de la Critique by the French dance press for their performance in A Love Supreme(Salva Sanchis and Anne Teresa De Keersmaeker / Rosas, 2017).

== Work as a teacher ==
In parallel with his choreographic activities, Salva Sanchis has developed an extensive pedagogical career. He has given dance workshops in different countries. At the same time, he has been closely associated since 2004 with P.A.R.T.S., the dance school where he studied. He is one of the permanent teachers, and is also responsible for the selection of new students. In his work as a dance teacher, Salva Sanchis focuses on an eclectic technical approach to improvisation that is strongly linked to his own choreographic work.

== Productions ==
Own work:

- Radical Light (Salva Sanchis, 2016)
- Islands Revisited (Salva Sanchis, 2015)
- Islands (Salva Sanchis, 2014)
- The Phantom Layer (Salva Sanchis, 2013)
- Angle (Salva Sanchis, 2012)
- now h e r e (Salva Sanchis, 2011)
- Action (Salva Sanchis and Kris Defoort, 2010)
- Objects in mirror are closer than they appear (Salva Sanchis, 2008)
- The Organ Project (Salva Sanchis and Bernard Foccroulle, 2008)
- Still Live (Salva Sanchis, 2007)
- Ten Variations in G (Salva Sanchis, 2006)
- Double Trio Live (Salva Sanchis, 2005)
- Double Duet Live (Salva Sanchis, 2004)
- Constant Relay (Salva Sanchis, 2002)
- Previous (Salva Sanchis, 2002)
- Itch & Fear (Salva Sanchis, 2000)
- Gap (Salva Sanchis, 2000)
- Reckless Reckoning (Salva Sanchis and Florence Augendre, 1998)
- Less than a moment (Salva Sanchis, 1998)
- Underline (Salva Sanchis, 1998)

With Anne Teresa De Keersmaeker / Rosas:

- A Love Supreme (Salva Sanchis and Anne Teresa De Keersmaeker / Rosas, 2017)
- Raga for the Rainy Season / A Love Supreme (Anne Teresa De Keersmaeker / Rosas, 2005)
- Desh (Anne Teresa De Keersmaeker / Rosas, 2005)
- Kassandra - speaking in twelve voices (Anne Teresa De Keersmaeker / Rosas, 2004)
- Bitches Brew / Tacoma Narrows (Anne Teresa De Keersmaeker / Rosas, 2003)

With Marc Vanrunxt:

- Trigon (Marc Vanrunxt, Salva Sanchis, Georgia Vardarou, 2012)
- For Edward Krasinski (Marc Vanrunxt, 2010)
- Most recent (Marc Vanrunxt, 2002)
- Some Problems of Space Perception (Marc Vanrunxt, 2001)
- Performance (Marc Vanrunxt, 2000)

With others:

- Phenomena (Georgia Vardarou, 2013)
- MicroSleepDub (Peter Lenaerts, 2015)
- Curtain'd with a cloudy red (Thomas Plischke, 1998)
- Only now does he turn (Jan Ritsema, 1997)

== Filmography ==
- Radical / Light (Robbrecht Desmet, 2016)

== Sources ==
- Overview page about Salva Sanchis on the website of kunst/werk
- Kunstenpunt - Persons - Salva Sanchis according to the Flemish Arts Institute
