= Van Imschoot =

Van Imschoot is a Belgian surname. Notable people with the surname include:

- Jan Van Imschoot (born 1963), Belgian artist
- Myriam Van Imschoot (born 1969), Belgian artist
- Paul van Imschoot (1889–1968), Belgian Catholic priest and theologian
- Tom Van Imschoot (born 1981), Belgian footballer
