= Lynda Gaudreau =

Canadian choreographer and artistic director

Lynda Gaudreau is a Canadian choreographer, installation artist, educator and artistic director living in Quebec.

She was born in Sept-Îles, Quebec. She studied art history and philosophy at the University of Ottawa, the Université de Montréal and the Université du Québec à Montréal. Gaudreau trained in jazz dance and classical dance. Her first choreographed work to gain recognition was Des Centaines de fois mon coeur in 1991. She appeared in the Festival international de nouvelle danse held the following year. She launched her own company Compagnie de Brune in 1992; they appeared in dance festivals throughout Europe an, in 1994, received the ADAM prize at the Rencontres chorégraphiques internationales de Seine-Saint-Denis.

Gaudreau is known for her exploration of human anatomy as shown in her works Anatomie (1996) and Still Life No. 1 (1996).From 1999 to 2007, she produced the four-part series Encyclopœdia which combined dance, exhibition, video and text. In 2005, she began a new multi-media project Clash; the series which included public presentations and discussion continued until 2010.

She has also choreographed works for the Batsheva Ensemble in Israel and for the Performing Arts Research and Training Studios in Belgium and worked with Brigitte Haentjens, a theatre director in Montreal. Between 2009 and 2012, she produced a number of experimental works: Black Out, Space Out and Out of Grace in Montreal, Out of the Blue in Avignon and Out of Grace in Leuven.

She is a member of the International Association of Curators of Contemporary Art. She is now based in Montreal.
