= Lüdi =

Lüdi is a Swiss surname. Notable people with the surname include:

- Fritz Lüdi, Swiss bobsledder
- Heinz Lüdi (born 1958), Swiss football player
- Sanna Lüdi (born 1986), Swiss skier
- Werner Lüdi (1936–2000), Swiss musician and author

== See also ==
- Ludi (surname)
- Ludi (disambiguation)
