= Thomas Hauert =

Swiss dancer and choreographer

Thomas Hauert is a Swiss dancer and choreographer, leader of the Brussels-based company ZOO.

== Early life and education ==
Born and raised in Switzerland, Thomas Hauert studied at the Rotterdam Dance Academy in the Netherlands.

== Career ==
He moved to Brussels in 1991 to work in Anne Teresa De Keersmaeker’s company Rosas. He then collaborated with David Zambrano, Gonnie Heggen and Pierre Droulers.

After the creation of the solo Hobokendans (1997), he founded his company ZOO (based on the name of a book used by the group as study material) with fellow dancers Mark Lorimer, Sarah Ludi, Mat Voorter and Samantha van Wissen. Their first performance, Cows in Space (1998), was awarded two prizes at the Rencontres chorégraphiques internationales de Seine-Saint-Denis.

The work of Hauert first developed from research on movement, with a particular interest in improvisation-based processes exploring the tension between freedom and constraint, individuals and the group, order and disorder, and form and formlessness. The relationship with music also plays a major part in his work. Since 1998, Hauert has created around 15 performances with his company ZOO. They were co-produced by European organizations such as Kaaitheater (Brussels), Kunstenfestivaldesarts (Brussels), Charleroi Danses, Centre Pompidou (Paris), Festival d'Automne à Paris, Théâtre de la Ville (Paris), Montpellier Danse, La Bâtie-Festival de Genève, Tanzquartier Wien (Vienna), Mercat de les Flors (Barcelona), Springdance (Utrecht) and PACT Zollverein (Essen). In addition to his work for ZOO, Hauert was commissioned to create pieces for external structures like P.A.R.T.S., the Trinity Laban Conservatoire of Music and Dance, the Zurich Ballet, Toronto Dance Theatre and Candoco. He participated in improvisation events like Movement Research Fall Festival 2008 and regularly improvises with musicians including Michel Debrulle, Chris Corsano and Barry Guy. In 2012, he was invited by IRCAM in Paris to lead a project on the relationship between improvised dance and electronic musical composition in the context of the festival-academy ManiFeste.

In 2010, the Belgian director Thierry De Mey created a film co-produced by European cultural television channel Arte, based on the ZOO's work Accords.

Hauert has developed a teaching method from his choreographic practice. As a teacher, he has an ongoing collaboration with the P.A.R.T.S. academy in Brussels and regularly gives workshops worldwide. In 2012–13, he was the Valeska-Gert-guest professor for dance and performance at the Institute for Theater Studies of the Free University of Berlin.

In 2012 he started participating in Motion Bank, a project initiated by The William Forsythe Company and Ohio State University.

Hauert is resident artist at Charleroi Danses and associated artist at Kaaitheater Brussels.

== Awards ==
- 1998: winner Prix d'auteur and Prix Jan Fabre at the Rencontres chorégraphiques internationales de Seine-Saint-Denis for Cows in Space
- 1998: winner Werkjahrespreis des Kantons Solothurn
- 2005: winner Swiss Dance and Choreography Prize for modify
- 2008: nominated for the Prix de la critique (Wallonie-Brussels) in the category Choreography for Accords
- 2013: nominated for the Dora Awards, Toronto, in the category Outstanding Choreography for Pond Skaters (creation for Toronto Dance Theatre)
- 2013: winner Current Dance Works Prize at the Swiss Dance Awards for From B to B
- 2013: winner Dance Prize of the Canton of Solothurn
- 2014: nominated for the Tribute to the Classical Arts Awards, New Orleans, in the category Outstanding Contemporary Dance Presentation for Like me more like me
- 2016: winner Swiss Dance and Choreography Prize for inaudible
- 2025: winner Swiss Prize Hans-Reinhart-Ring

== Works ==
=== Choreography for ZOO ===
- 1998: Cows in Space
- 1999: Pop-Up Songbook
- 2000: Jetzt
- 2001: Do You Believe in Gravity? Do You Trust the Pilot?
- 2002: Verosimile
- 2003: 5
- 2004: modify
- 2004: Drum & Dance
- 2005: More or Less Sad Songs
- 2006: Walking Oscar
- 2006: Parallallemande
- 2007: puzzled (created with Zefiro Torna)
- 2008: Accords
- 2009: Solo for EKL (in Korean Screens)
- 2010: You've changed
- 2011: From B to B (co-created with Ángels Margarit)
- 2011: Like me more like me (co-created with Scott Heron)
- 2012: Danse étoffée sur musique déguisée
- 2013: MONO
- 2015: (sweet) (bitter)
- 2016: inaudible
- 2018: How to Proceed
- 2020: If Only
- 2022: Conférence dansée
- 2022: Efeu
- 2024: Troglodyte, Zaungast/Zaunkönig

=== For other organisations ===
- 1991: Juppe ("Rotterdam in Beweging" festival)
- 1996: Solo for "Thé dansant" series at Plateau in Brussels
- 1997: Hobokendans (for company Pierre Droulers)
- 2000: Milky Way (for P.A.R.T.S)
- 2002: Hà Mais (for Alma Txina, co-production ZOO)
- 2004: Lobster Caravan (for P.A.R.T.S)
- 2005: Fold & Twine (for The Trinity Laban Conservatoire of Music and Dance)
- 2007: 12/8 (for P.A.R.T.S)
- 2010: Il Giornale della necropoli (for the Zürcher Ballett)
- 2010: Regarding the area between the inseparable (for P.A.R.T.S)
- 2012: One moving as many moving as one (for Free University of Berlin)
- 2013: Pond Skaters (for Toronto Dance Theatre)
- 2014: Notturnino (for Candoco Dance Company)
- 2017: Rhapsody on a theme of Accords (Ballet Junior Genève, chorégraphie par Thomas Hauert, Liz Kinoshita, Mat Voorter)
- 2018: Flot (CCN Ballet de Lorraine)
- 2019: The occasional tendency of seven to coalesce (University of Arts Stockholm)
- 2021: Re.visited – 3 Works on Mozart (Gärtner Platz Theater, Munich)
- 2025: Playing with Sergei, Martha and the others (Dresden Frankfurt Dance Company)

=== Films ===
- 2000: Space In (directed by Aliosha Van der Avoort)
- 2010: La Valse (directed by Thierry De Mey)
- 2023: Syntropia (directed by Andrea Pellerani)
