= Christine De Smedt =

Belgian dancer and choreographer

Christine De Smedt is a Belgian dancer and choreographer. Her artistic work is situated on the boundary between dance / performance, choreography, artistic coordination and artistic projects of various kinds.

== Early life and education ==
After completing her studies in criminology, Christine De Smedt became interested in dance and performance and began to study different techniques for motion research.

== Career ==
=== Les ballets C de la B ===
From 1991 to 2012, De Smedt was a member of les ballets C de la B, the Ghent dance company founded by Alain Platel, which was also home for a long time to Hans van den Broeck, Sidi Larbi Cherkaoui and Koen Augustijnen. She danced in Mussen (Alain Platel, 1991) and was assistant director on How to approach a dog (Hans Van den Broeck, 1992). From 2003 to 2005 she was the artistic coordinator of les ballets C de la B. In 2010 she initiated the first Summer Intensive, a residence in studio 3 at les ballets C de la B.

=== Meg Stuart / Damaged Goods ===
In 1992, De Smedt was part of the interdisciplinary SKITE project (laboratoire de nouvelles formes chorégraphiques) in Paris, where her first artistic encounter with the American choreographer Meg Stuart took place. She also collaborated with Meg Stuart and her company Damaged Goods between 1995 and 1999. In 1996, she danced in the remake of Stuart's debut choreography Disfigure Study (Meg Stuart / Damaged Goods, 1991), and assisted the choreographer as a coach for this remake. In addition, she worked as a dancer on No One's Watching (Meg Stuart / Damaged Goods, 1995) and Splayed Mind Out (Meg Stuart / Damaged Goods and Gary Hill, 1997) ). Together with Meg Stuart and choreographer / dancer David Hernandez, she initiated the multi-disciplinary improvisation project Crash Landing (1996-1999).

=== Own choreography ===
De Smedt started her own work in the period when she was a member of les ballets C de la B. Her debut was the dance solo La force fait l'union fait la force (1994). One of her best-known projects from that period is 9x9 (2000), a large-scale choreographic project that was realized in 15 different cities in Europe and Canada. The starting point for the project, in which the choreographer was working with participants of diverse backgrounds such as elderly, young people and photographers, was the human mass. Another well-known production by De Smedt is Untitled 4 (2012), based on four interviews with the choreographers and dancers Alain Platel, Jonathan Burrows, Eszter Salamon and Xavier Le Roy, and in which she increasingly becomes at the same time the portrayed persons themselves. For the festival Dansand! II in Ostend, she created in 2010 together with Mette Edvardsen the mass choreography The Long Piece. Together with Eszter Salamon, she created the duet dance#2 (2012), and with Myriam Van Imschoot PickUpVoices (2008), that mixed historical research with performance.

=== Other collaborations as a dancer ===
As a dancer, she also collaborated on Gerhard Richter, une pièce pour le théâtre (Mårten Spångberg, 2017), Oidipous, my foot (Jan Ritsema, 2011), Artificial Nature Project (Mette Ingvartsen, 2012), Project (Xavier Le Roy, 2003), Low Pieces (Xavier Le Roy, 2011), Temporary Title (Xavier Le Roy, 2015), nvsbl (Eszter Salamon, 2006) and dance#1/Driftworks (Eszter Salamon, 2008). Furthermore, she collaborated on the video installation Dead Reckoning (2008) by Philipp Gehmacher and Vladimir Miller.

== Research ==
With Eszter Salamon, De Smedt developed in 2009 Transformers, a research project for a group choreography through workshops and artists' residences in Brussels, Madrid, PAF-St. Erme, Mexico City, Vienna, Tokyo and Stockholm. In May 2014, she collaborated on Spatial Confessions, a four-day program of Bojana Cvejic in Tate Modern, which examined through choreographic experiments publicness in places exhibiting contemporary art.

== Teaching ==
De Smedt was Pedagogical Coordinator of the Training Cycle 2013-2016 at P.A.R.T.S., the International School of Contemporary Dance in Brussels.

== Productions ==
Own work:

- Weibliche Bewegungsfigur 094210 (Christine De Smedt and Damien Deceuninck, 1989)
- La force fait l’union fait la force (Christine De Smedt, 1993)
- Crash Landing (Christine De Smedt, David Hernandez and Meg Stuart / Damaged Goods, 1996-1999)
- Escape Velocity (Christine De Smedt in collaboration with Els Opsomer, Germaine Kruip and Vincent Malstaf, 1998)
- Untitled 4 (Christine De Smedt, 2010)
- 9 x 9 (Christine De Smedt, 2010)
- The Long Piece (Christine De Smedt and Mette Edvardsen, 2010)
- dance#2 (Christine De Smedt and Eszter Salamon, 2016)

With others:

- Mussen (Alain Platel / les ballets C de la B, 1991)
- How to approach a dog (Hans Van den Broeck / les ballets C de la B, 1992)
- Disfigure Study (Meg Stuart / Damaged Goods, restaging in 1996)
- No One Is Watching (Meg Stuart / Damaged Goods, 1995)
- Splayed Mind Out (Meg Stuart / Damaged Goods en Gary Hill, 1997)
- Schreibstück - Version Christine De Smedt, Gent (BE) (Thomas Lehmen, 2002-2004)
- Project (Xavier Le Roy, 2003)
- nvsbl (Eszter Salamon, 2006)
- dance#1/Driftworks (Eszter Salamon, 2008)
- The Mirror Points (Gary Hill, 2009)
- Oidipous, my foot (Jan Ritsema, 2011)
- Low Pieces (Xavier Le Roy, 2011)
- The Artificial Nature Project (Mette Ingvartsen, 2012)
- Temporary Title (Xavier Le Roy, 2015)
- Gerhard Richter, une pièce pour le théâtre (Mårten Spångberg, 2017)

== Videography ==
- La force fait l’union fait la force (Johan Grimonprez, 1994, 3min)
- 'UNDER INFLUENCE' (Sidney Leoni, 2016, Hiros, 1H13min)
