= Claudia Hill =

Interdisciplinary artist based in Berlin

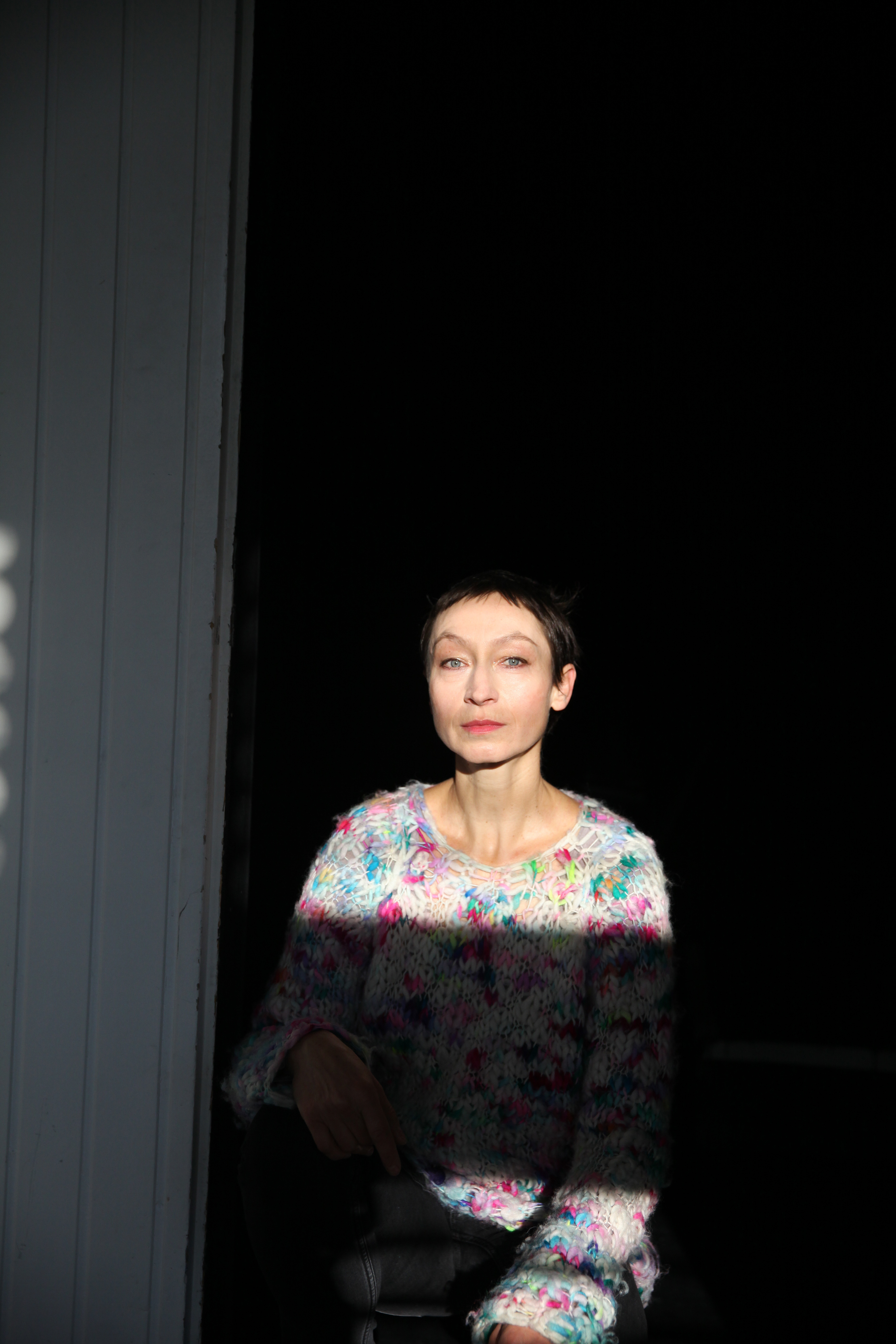
- Claudia Hill by Dorothea Tuch
- Education: FIT, Parsons
- Occupation: Artist
- Known for: Textile art
- Website: https://claudiahill.com/

Claudia Hill is a German artist, based in Berlin whose practice centers on textiles. She explores themes of interconnectedness through textile-based processes and forms. Her work has been presented internationally at venues including Museum moderner Kunst Stiftung Ludwig Wien mumok, Shedhalle Zürich, Centre Pompidou, Paris Internationale, Les Rencontres Internationales, ZKM Center for Art and Media Karlsruhe, BAM Brooklyn Academy of Music, HAU Hebbel am Ufer, Broadway theatre, the Smithsonian Institution and as part of Gallery Weekend Berlin.

== Background and education ==
Hill was born in Germany and comes from a line of tailors of Czech origin on her mother's side. In 1993, she moved to New York to study contemporary dance where shortly after, she enrolled at FIT and Parsons. At the same time, she began to work as a costume designer and was admitted to the United Scenic Artists in 1997. She returned to Europe in 2008 and now lives in Berlin, where she became an active member of the performing arts scene as a costume and stage designer. Since 2021, she has developed a visual art practice focused on weaving.

== Textile art ==
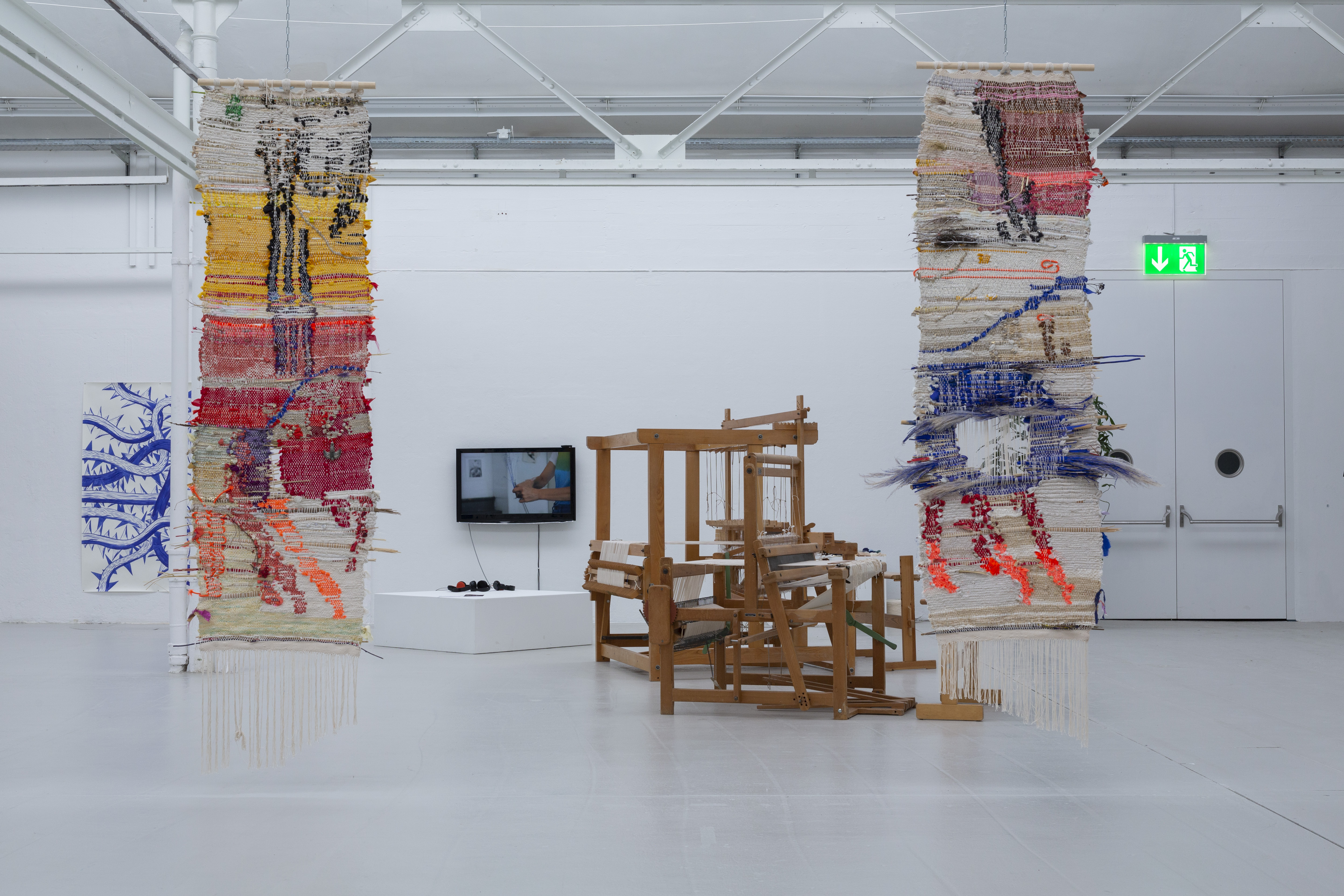
Shedhalle Zurich, exhibition photo by Carla Schleiffer

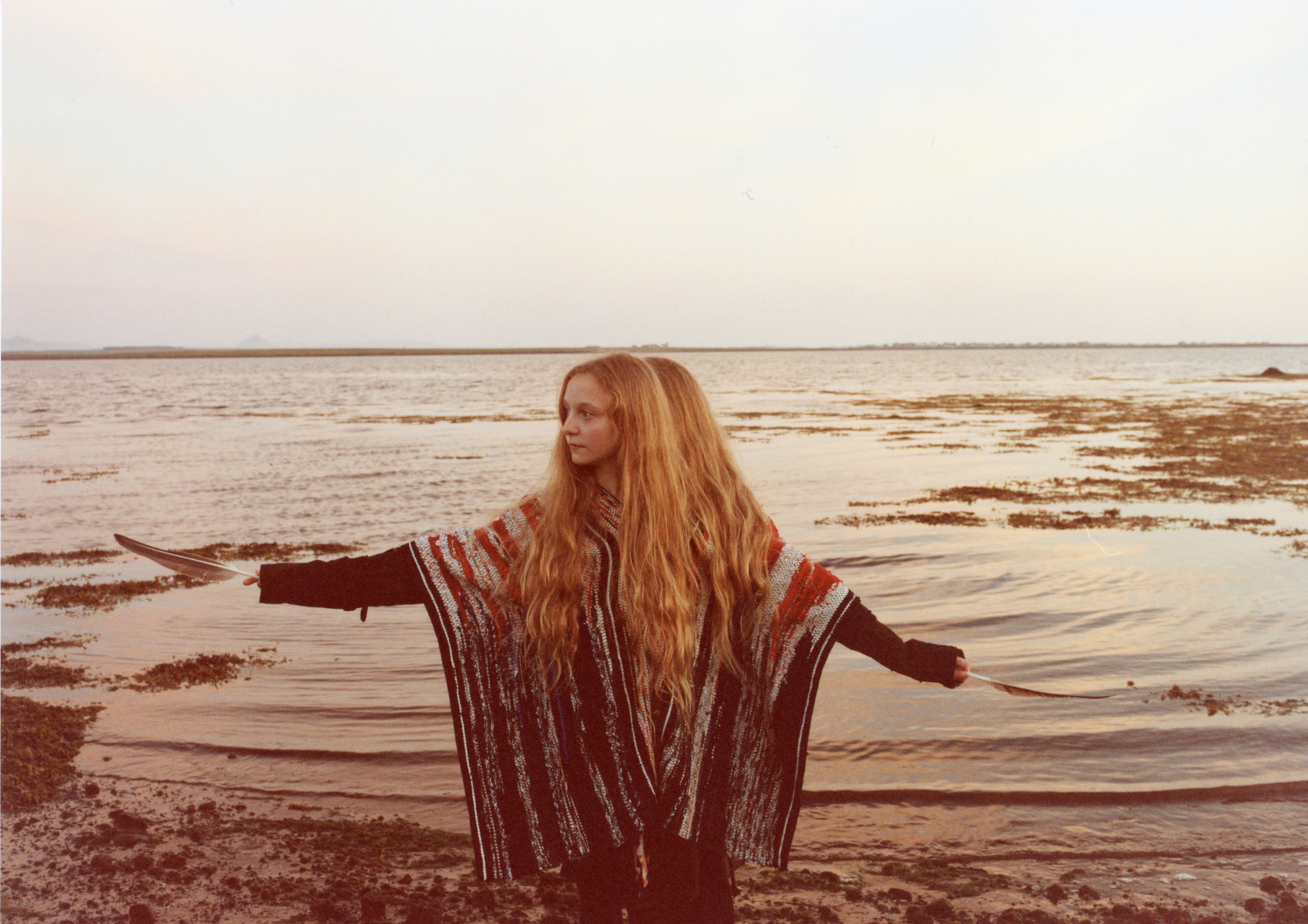
Social Fabric Earth Return, publication photo by Ariko Inaoka

In 2011, she initiated the long-term book project, Social Fabric Earth Return, which addresses themes of interconnectedness and was published in 2021. Released in conjunction with an exhibition of the same name during Gallery Weekend Berlin, the publication features contributions by CA Conrad, Rirkrit Tiravanija, The Wooster Group, and other artists from around the world. Since then, she has developed textile installations that sometimes incorporate elements of film and performance. Also in 2021 she started a series of collectively woven tapestries using a late 19th-century wooden loom. Her practice is influenced by exchanges with weaving communities in the Andes and engages with materials, authorship and forms of connection.

== Collaborations ==
Her work in costume design and performance informs the collaborative and performative aspects of her practice. She created the costumes for William Forsythe's Decreation in 2003 and for The Wooster Group's production of Hamlet in 2007. Among others she became a frequent collaborator of the choreographer Meg Stuart, creating costumes for Sketches/Notebook in 2013,Hunter in 2014, and Glitch Witch in 2024.

== Fashion (1998–2011) ==
In 1998, she founded two fashion labels, the eponymous Claudia Hill and The Number After 10, both of which were presented and sold in Japan, the US and Europe, at her own store, and high-end boutiques, such as Barneys New York and Fred Segal as well as exclusively at private salons in limited editions. Her New York Fashion Week. shows were deemed unconventional and took the form of performances or installations, often in collaboration with other artists, such as Asymptote Architecture or Skúli Sverrisson.
