= Samantha van Wissen =

Dutch dancer (born 1970)

Samantha van Wissen (born 1970) is a Dutch dancer who is mostly known for her work with the Brussels-based choreographers Anne Teresa De Keersmaeker / Rosas and Thomas Hauert / ZOO.

== Early life and education ==
Samantha van Wissen was born in 1970 in Roermond, The Netherlands.

She studied at the Hogeschool voor Muziek en Theater Rotterdam (now Codarts), in Rotterdam.

== Career ==
Afterwards she moved to Brussels and joined Rosas, the dance company of Anne Teresa De Keersmaeker, and afterwards ZOO, the dance company of Thomas Hauert.

=== Collaboration with Anne Teresa De Keersmaeker and Rosas ===
The first Rosas productions in which Van Wissen danced are Erts (Anne Teresa De Keersmaeker / Rosas, 1992) and Mozart / Concert Arias. Un moto di gioia. (Anne Teresa De Keersmaeker / Rosas, 1992). Afterwards, a wide range of other new Rosas productions followed. The most recent productions are Work / Travail / Labor (Anne Teresa De Keersmaeker / Rosas, 2015) and Così fan tutte (Anne Teresa De Keersmaeker / Rosas and Opéra national de Paris, 2017). She also participated in the restaging of the Rosas productions Rosas danst Rosas (Anne Teresa De Keersmaeker / Rosas, 1983), Elena's Aria (Anne Teresa De Keersmaeker / Rosas, 1984), Bartók / Mikrokosmos (Anne Teresa De Keersmaeker / Rosas, 1987), Achterland (Anne Teresa De Keersmaeker / Rosas, 1990), Drumming (Anne Teresa De Keersmaeker / Rosas and Ictus, 1998) and Rain (Anne Teresa De Keersmaeker / Rosas and Ictus, 2001). The Rosas productions tour worldwide. She can also be seen in a number of movies and videos made about or based on Rosas productions.

=== Collaboration with Thomas Hauert / ZOO ===
In 1997, Van Wissen also joined ZOO, the dance company of Brussels-based Swiss choreographer Thomas Hauert, to collaborate as a dancer on Cows in Space (Thomas Hauert / ZOO, 1998). After that another ten ZOO productions followed.

=== Collaboration with others ===
She also worked together with Fabián Barba, an Ecuadorian dancer and choreographer who studied at the dance school P.A.R.T.S. in Brussels and also collaborated with Thomas Hauert. She also danced in some productions that director Inne Goris made for children, and in a production by video artist / musician Walter Verdin.

Since 2021, Van Wissen works with François Gremaud and stars in his critically acclaimed Giselle..., based on the eponymous romantic ballet.

== Teaching ==
For several years, Van Wissen was a teacher (repertoire of Anne Teresa De Keersmaeker and yoga) at P.A.R.T.S., the dance school in Brussels founded by Anne Teresa De Keersmaeker. Since 2008, she has been teaching the repertoire of Anne Teresa De Keersmaeker (and contemporary dance techniques) annually at ImPulsTanz - Vienna International Dance Festival Together with Anne Teresa De Keersmaeker, Van Wissen also participated in the project [Re: Rosas!], an art-based YouTube project of fABULEUS, inviting everyone to remix the chair scene from the choreography of Rosas dans Rosas (Anne Teresa De Keersmaeker / Rosas, 1983). In three instructional films they explain together step by step the different movements and the structure of the choreography.

Van Wissen has also been teaching dance for fifteen years at the cultural center Westrand in Dilbeek, a Belgian municipality in the province of Flemish Brabant. She was also a contemporary dance, improvisation and movement theater coach for Danspunt.

== Productions ==
=== With Anne Teresa De Keersmaeker / Rosas ===
- Erts (Anne Teresa De Keersmaeker / Rosas, 1992)
- Mozart / Concert Arias. Un moto di gioia. (Anne Teresa De Keersmaeker / Rosas, 1992)
- Kinok (Anne Teresa De Keersmaeker / Rosas, 1994)
- Amor constante, más allá de la muerte (Anne Teresa De Keersmaeker / Rosas, 1994)
- Erwartung / Verklärte Nacht (Anne Teresa De Keersmaeker / Rosas, 1995)
- Woud, three movements to the music of Berg, Schönberg & Wagner (Anne Teresa De Keersmaeker / Rosas, 1996)
- Duke Bluebeard's castle (Anne Teresa De Keersmaeker / Rosas, 1998)
- Repertory Evening (Anne Teresa De Keersmaeker / Rosas, 2002)
- Verklärte Nacht (Anne Teresa De Keersmaeker / Rosas, 2014)
- Work/Travail/Arbeid (Anne Teresa De Keersmaeker / Rosas, 2015)
- Così fan tutte (Anne Teresa De Keersmaeker / Rosas and Opéra national de Paris, 2017)

Van Wissen also collaborated on the restagings of the Rosas productions Rosas danst Rosas (Anne Teresa De Keersmaeker / Rosas, 1983), Elena's Aria (Anne Teresa De Keersmaeker / Rosas, 1984), Bartók / Mikrokosmos (Anne Teresa De Keersmaeker / Rosas, 1987), Achterland (Anne Teresa De Keersmaeker / Rosas, 1990), Drumming (Anne Teresa De Keersmaeker / Rosas and Ictus, 1998) and Rain (Anne Teresa De Keersmaeker / Rosas and Ictus, 2001).

=== With Thomas Hauert / ZOO ===
- Cows in space (Thomas Hauert / ZOO, 1998)
- Pop-Up Songbook (Thomas Hauert / ZOO, 1999)
- Jetzt (Thomas Hauert / ZOO, 2000)
- Verosimile (Thomas Hauert / ZOO, 2002)
- 5 (Thomas Hauert, Mark Lorimer, Sara Ludi, Van Wissen and Mat Voorter / ZOO, 2003)
- More or less sad songs (Thomas Hauert, Martin Kilvady, Sara Ludi, Chrysa Parkinson, Samantha van Wissen and Mat Voorter / ZOO, 2005)
- Walking Oscar (Thomas Hauert / ZOO, 2006)
- Puzzled (Jurgen De bruyn/Zefiro Torna and Thomas Hauert / ZOO, 2007)
- Accords (Thomas Hauert / ZOO, 2008)
- You've Changed (Thomas Hauert / ZOO, 2010)
- MONO (Thomas Hauert / ZOO, 2013)

=== With Inne Goris ===
- Drie zusters (Inne Goris, 2003)
- Droesem (Inne Goris, 2007)

=== With Fabián Barba ===
- A personal yet collective history (Fabián Barba, 2012)
- slugs’ garden/cultivo de babosas (Fabián Barba and Esteban Donoso, 2017)

=== With Walter Verdin ===
- Storm (Walter Verdin, 1999)

=== With François Gremaud / 2b company ===
- Giselle... (François Gremaud, Samantha Van Wissen, Luca Antignani, 2021)

== Filmography ==
- Mozartmateriaal (Jurgen Persijn and Ana Torfs, 1993)
- Rosas danst Rosas (Thierry De Mey, 1997)

== Sources ==
- Kunstenpunt - Persons - Samantha van Wissen according to the Flemish Arts Institute
- Vimeo channel of Thomas Hauert / ZOO
