= Ludi (surname) =

Ludi is a surname. Notable people with the surname include:

- Carlalberto Ludi (born 1982), Italian footballer
- Sarah Ludi (born 1971), Swiss dancer
- Stephanie Ludi, American computer scientist

== See also ==
- Lüdi, a Swiss surname
