= Myriam Van Imschoot =

Brussels-based artist

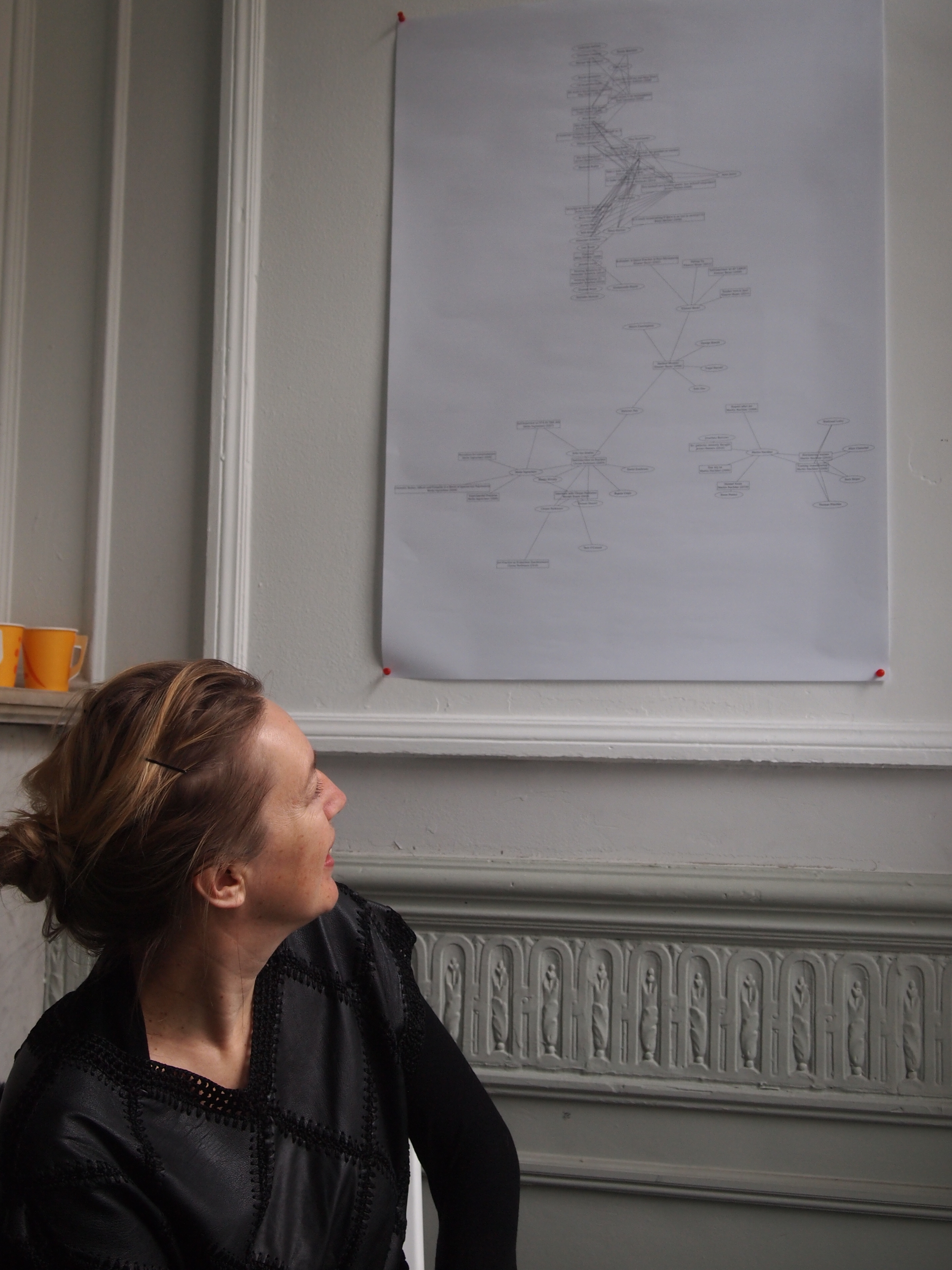
Myriam Van Imschoot in 2011 at Tagging Matters, Constant (Brussels)

Myriam Van Imschoot (born 1969) is a Brussels-based artist. She uses the voice as her main medium in video, performance and sound installations. The position Van Imschoot occupies in the Belgian art scene is characterized by a movement between the institutional field and the medias, through which she experiments with already existing contexts, if not creating her own. Myriam is a founding member of Sarma and runs within this organization a publishing house for digital artist publications that embraces orality. She forms a duo with sound poet Marcus Bergner (Arf Arf).

== Biography ==
Myriam Van Imschoot graduated in Germanic Philology and specialized in Performance Studies at the University of Leuven in Belgium. She worked as a dance critic for Gazet van Antwerpen from 1993 to 1995 and De Morgen from 1995 to 1998. In 1995 she became a staff member of the Institute of Cultural Studies at the same university. In 1998, Van Imschoot left journalism and became a full-time researcher, with the support of the Fund for Scientific Research. She completed a PhD on improvisation in cultures of spontaneity and the post-war avant-garde.

As an artist, she started working first with archives as her medium. The duet Pick up Voices (2007) with performer and choreographer Christine De Smedt and the sound installation Black Box (2009) show an interest in the performative potential of archival documents and the construction of alternative historiographies through them. Her solo Living Archive (2011) was a personal testimony of what could be "any girl living next door with a passion for mixed tapes". Acclaimed for its originality, it was shown in Kaaitheater, Vooruit and Buda Arts Centre, among others.

Fascinated by phenomena of long-distance communication, Van Imschoot started a cycle of works that deal with yodeling, crying, waving and bird calls. Hola Hu (2013) and Kucku (2014) are yodel duets that reframe folklore as it gets transmitted and altered. The yodel duets tour in galleries, theaters and concert halls, sometimes accompanied by the video installation Yodel Portraits. She also used video as a medium for LIFT and Efemeriden, both filmed from her apartment located in a signature building in Brussels.

The work of Myriam Van Imschoot has been presented by Sculpture International Rotterdam (The Netherlands), Nodar Binaural Sound Center, Rumpsti-Pumsti (Musik), MUU Galeria, Playground Stuk (Leuven, Belgium), Jan Van Eyck Academie (Maastricht, The Netherlands), Kaaitheater (Brussels, Belgium), Vooruit (Ghent, Belgium), Kunstencentrum Buda (Kortrijk, Belgium), Museo Reina Sofia (Madrid, Spain), De Player, Operdagen Rotterdam (The Netherlands), Pact Zollverein, Techno Park Studios, Campo, Kiasma Theater (Helsinki, Finland).
