= Ludus =

Ludus may refer to:

- Ludus (ancient Rome) (plural ludi), several meanings around "play, game, sport, training"
  - Ludi, public games held for the benefit and entertainment of the Roman people
  - Instrumental play
- Luduș, a town in Transylvania, Romania
- Ludus Magnus and other gladiatorial training schools
- Ludus (love), playful love, a type of love style in the color wheel theory of love
- Ludus (band), a British post-punk band 1978–1983
- "Ludus", one of two movements in Tabula Rasa (Pärt), a 1977 musical composition by the Estonian composer Arvo Pärt

== See also ==
- Ludus amoris
