= Sarah Ludi =

Swiss dancer (born 1971)

Sarah Ludi (1971) is a Swiss dancer who is based in Brussels and is best known for her work with the choreographers Anne Teresa De Keersmaeker / Rosas and Thomas Hauert / ZOO.

== Training ==
Sarah Ludi was born in Switzerland and grew up in Geneva. As a dancer, she was formed at the Ballet Junior de Genève, and by the Argentinian but in Geneva working choreographer Noemi Lapzeson.

== Collaboration with Anne Teresa De Keersmaeker / Rosas ==
From Geneva she traveled to Paris and then to Brussels, where she joined the dance company Rosas of Anne Teresa De Keersmaeker. The first new Rosas production in which danced was Kinok (Anne Teresa De Keersmaeker / Rosas, 1994). After that, a handful of other new productions followed, plus the restagings of three older productions (including Rosas danst Rosas (Anne Teresa De Keersmaeker / Rosas, 1983).

== Collaboration with Thomas Hauert / ZOO ==
From 1998 she also started dancing in productions of the dance company ZOO of the Swiss, but in Brussels residing choreographer Thomas Hauert. She has danced in eight of his choreographies, and is one of the core dancers of his company. At ZOO, Sarah Ludi was also artistic co-responsible for two other productions: More or less sad songs (Thomas Hauert, Martin Kilvady, Sara Ludi, Chrysa Parkinson, Samantha van Wissen and Mat Voorter / ZOO, 2005) and 5 (Thomas Hauert, Mark Lorimer, Sara Ludi, Samantha van Wissen and Mat Voorter / ZOO, 2003). With All Instruments (Sarah Ludi in collaboration with Laurent Blondiau, João Lobo and Yves Pezet, 2014) she also developed her own production.

== Collaboration with others ==
In the past few years Sarah Ludi has also collaborated on productions by other choreographers: Time Has Fallen Asleep in the Afternoon Sunshine (2010) by Mette Edvardsen / Athome and Gerhard Richter, une pièce pour le théâtre (2017) by Mårten Spångberg. She can also be seen in some dance films by Thierry De Mey, Yves Pezet and Boris Van der Avoort.

== Teacher Alexander Technique ==
In 2006, Sarah Ludi discovered the Alexander Technique, a practical (self-help) method that has the purpose of moving effortlessly and freely. She began studying Alexander Technique by following the teacher training at the Leuven-based Alexander Technique Center. Currently, she teaches herself Alexander Technique, in conjunction with her activities as a dancer.

== Productions ==
Own work:

- Continuum (Brice Leroux and Sarah Ludi, 1999)
- 5 (Thomas Hauert, Mark Lorimer, Sara Ludi, Samantha van Wissen and Mat Voorter / ZOO, 2003)
- More or less sad songs (Thomas Hauert, Martin Kilvady, Sara Ludi, Chrysa Parkinson, Samantha van Wissen and Mat Voorter / ZOO, 2005)
- All Instruments (Sarah Ludi, in collaboration with Laurent Blondiau, João Lobo and Yves Pezet / ZOO, 2014)

With Anne Teresa De Keersmaeker / Rosas:

- Kinok (Anne Teresa De Keersmaeker/Rosas, 1994)
- Amor constante, más allá de la muerte (Anne Teresa De Keersmaeker / Rosas, 1994)
- Erwartung / Verklärte Nacht (Anne Teresa De Keersmaeker / Rosas, 1995)
- Woud, three movements to the music of Berg, Schönberg & Wagner (Anne Teresa De Keersmaeker / Rosas, 1996)
- Duke Bluebeard's castle (Anne Teresa De Keersmaeker / Rosas, 1998)
- Repertory Evening (Anne Teresa De Keersmaeker / Rosas, 2002)
- Work/Travail/Arbeid (Anne Teresa De Keersmaeker / Rosas, 2015)

Sarah Ludi also danced in restagings of Mozart / Concert Arias. Un moto di gioia. (Anne Teresa De Keersmaeker / Rosas, 1992), Bartók / Mikrokosmos (Anne Teresa De Keersmaeker / Rosas, 1987) and Rosas danst Rosas (Anne Teresa De Keersmaeker / Rosas, 1983).

With Thomas Hauert / ZOO:

- Cows in space (Thomas Hauert / ZOO, 1998)
- Pop-Up Songbook (Thomas Hauert / ZOO, 1999)
- Jetzt (Thomas Hauert / ZOO, 2000)
- Verosimile (Thomas Hauert / ZOO, 2002)
- Modify (Thomas Hauert / ZOO, 2004)
- Walking Oscar (Thomas Hauert / ZOO, 2006)
- Accords (Thomas Hauert / ZOO, 2008)
- MONO (Thomas Hauert / ZOO, 2013)

With Mette Evardsen / Athome:

- Time Has Fallen Asleep in the Afternoon Sunshine (Mette Evardsen / Athome, 2010)

With Mårten Spångberg:

- Gerhard Richter, une pièce pour le théâtre (Mårten Spångberg, 2017)

== Filmography ==
- La Valse (Thierry De Mey, 2011)
- Cows in Space re-run (Yves Pezet, 2008)
- Space In (Boris Van der Avoort, 2000)
- Rosas danst Rosas (Thierry De Mey, 1997)

== Sources ==
- Kunstenpunt - Persons – Sarah Ludi according to the Flemish Arts Institute
