= Meg Stuart =

American choreographer and dancer (born 1965)

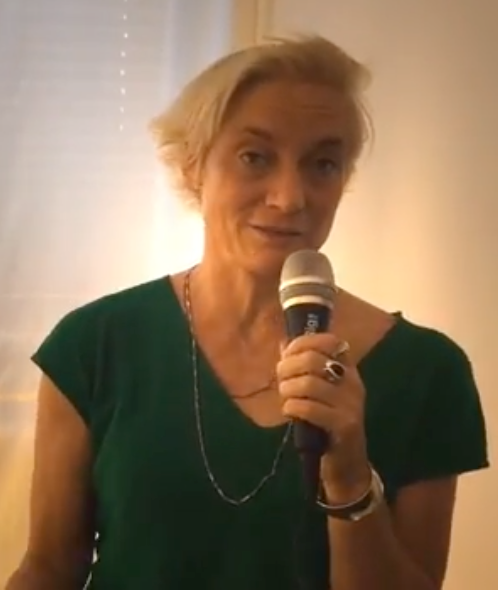
- In a 2016 interview
- Born: 1965 (age 60–61); New Orleans, Louisiana, US
- Education: New York University
- Occupations: Choreographer, dancer

Meg Stuart (born 1965) is an American choreographer and dancer who lives and works in Brussels and Berlin. Her company, Damaged Goods, has operated from Brussels since 1994.

== Start as a dancer and choreographer ==
Stuart was born in New Orleans in 1965. She moved to New York City in 1983 where she studied at New York University. She continued her studies at Movement Research (New York) where she studied several release techniques and was active in the Downtown New York dance scene. In the eighties she worked as a dancer for Nina Martin, Lisa Kraus, Federico Restrepo and Marcus Stern. For five years (1986–1992) she was part of the Randy Warshaw Dance Company. On the invitation of the Klapstuk festival in Leuven (BE) in 1991 she created Disfigure Study, her first evening-length performance, which launched her career in Europe. In Disfigure Study, Meg Stuart approaches the body as a vulnerable physical entity, one that can be deformed, deconstructed, and displaced but still resonates with meaning.

== Damaged Goods ==
Interested in devising her own structure, Stuart founded Damaged Goods in Brussels in 1994. Damaged Goods is an open and flexible structure, which makes the production of highly diverse projects and interdisciplinary collaborations possible. Together they have worked on a broad range of projects, ranging from solos such as XXX for Arlene and Colleagues (1995), Soft Wear (2000) and the evening-length solo Hunter (2014) to large-scale choreographies such as Visitors Only (2003), Built to Last (2012) and UNTIL OUR HEARTS STOP (2015). Other projects include video works, installations and site-specific creations. Her work has travelled the international theatre circuit and has also been presented at Documenta X in Kassel (1997), at Manifesta7 in Bolzano (2008) and at PERFORMA09 in New York.

Damaged Goods has an ongoing collaboration with Kaaitheater (Brussels) and HAU Hebbel am Ufer (Berlin). Before they also worked together with Schauspielhaus Zürich (2000–2004), Volksbühne am Rosa-Luxemburg-Platz Berlin (2005–2010), Münchner Kammerspiele (2010–2015) and Ruhrtriennale (2015–2017)

== Improvisation and artistic collaboration ==
Improvisation is an important part of Meg Stuart's practice. She initiated several improvisation projects, such as Crash Landing and Auf den Tisch!. In 2016 Stuart hosted City Lights – a continuous gathering in the Berlin HAU Hebbel am Ufer, in collaboration with an all female group of local artists.

Stuart strives to develop a new language for every piece in collaboration with artists from different creative disciplines and navigates the tension between dance and theatre. Previous collaborations include works developed with visual artists Gary Hill and Ann Hamilton, and composers such as Hahn Rowe and Brendan Dougherty. Through improvisation, Stuart explores physical and emotional states or the memories of them. Her artistic work is analogous to a constantly shifting identity. It constantly redefines itself while searching for new presentation contexts and territories for dance.

== Teaching ==
Alongside her work as a choreographer, Stuart regularly teaches workshops and master classes at dance schools, festivals and institutions. In the book Are we here yet? (2nd edition, 2013), she reflects on her practice in conversation with editor Jeroen Peeters and describes the exercises, tasks and narratives that she uses in workshops and the creative process.

== Awards ==
Meg Stuart and Damaged Goods received the K.U.Leuven Culture Price (2000), the German Theatre prize Der Faust (2006) for her choreography of Replacement, the prestigious French Prize for Criticism (2008) for BLESSED, a New York Dance and Performance Award (2008), also known as BESSIE Award for her oeuvre, the Flemish Culture Prize (2008) and the Konrad Wolf Preiz 2012.

In 2014 Meg Stuart received the Grand Prix de la Danse de Montréal, a prize that is awarded since 2011 to dance artists that contributed greatly to the art of dance. That same year the German magazine Tanz – Zeitschrift für Ballett, Tanz und Performance crowned her choreographer of the year for her productions Sketches/Notebook and Hunter.

In 2018, The Venice Biennale awarded Meg Stuart the Golden Lion for Lifetime Achievement in the category of dance. She receives the prize for her constant developing of new languages and methods for each new creation, in which she keeps on redefining new contexts and territories for dance. Meg Stuart/Damaged Goods also received the Deutscher Tanzpreis Award for outstanding performer from Dachverband Tanz Deutschland that year.

== Choreographies/collaborations ==
- Disfigure Study, 1991
- No Longer Readymade, 1993
- Swallow my yellow smile, 1994
- XXX for Arlene and Colleagues, 1995
- No One is Watching, 1995
- Inside Skin #1 They live in Our Breath, 1996
- Splayed Mind Out, 1997
- Remote, 1997
- appetite, 1999
- Comeback, 1999
- Snapshots, 1999
- I'm all yours, 2000
- Private Room, 2000
- sand table, 2000
- Soft Wear, 2000
- Highway 101, 2000/2001
- Alibi, 2001
- Henry IV, 2002
- Das goldene Zeitalter, 2003
- Visitors Only, 2003
- Forgeries, Love and Other Matters, 2004
- Der Marterphahl, 2005
- REPLACEMENT, 2006
- It's not funny!, 2006
- Blessed, 2007
- Maybe Forever, 2007
- All Together Now, 2008
- Die Massnahme/Mauser, 2008
- Do Animals Cry, 2009
- the fault lines, 2010
- Signs of Affection, 2010
- Off Course, 2010
- Atelier, 2011
- VIOLET, 2011
- Built to Last, 2012
- Sketches/Notebook, 2013
- An evening of solo works, 2013
- Hunter, 2014
- UNTIL OUR HEARTS STOP, 2015
- Inflamável, 2016
- Shown and Told, 2016
- Atelier III, 2017
- Projecting [Space[, 2017
- Celestial Sorrow, 2018

== Improvisations ==
- Crash Landing, 1996–1999
- Auf den Tisch!, 2005–2011
- Politics of Ecstasy, 2009
- Atelier II, 2012
- City Lights – a continuous gathering, 2016

== Projects ==
- Running, 1992
- This is the Show and the Show is Many Things, 1994
- Revisited, 2007
- walk+talk #2, 2008
- Intimate Strangers, Brussels, 2008
- walk+talk #16, 2011
- Intimate Strangers, Ghent, 2011

== Video works ==
- Smell the flowers while you can (Johan Grimonprez, 1994–2012, 6 min)
- Meg Stuart’s Alibi (Maarten Vanden Abeele, 2001, 24 min)
- the invited (Jonathan Inksetter, 2003, 12 min)
- Somewhere in between (Pierre Coulibeuf, 2004, 67 min)
- The Only Possible City (Meg Stuart, 2008)
- I thought I'd never say this (Philipp Hochleichter, 2008, video-installatie)
- Inflamável (Meg Stuart, 2016, 16 min)
- Study of a Portrait (Meg Stuart, 2016, video-installatie)

== Collaborations ==
Various projects by Meg Stuart were created in collaboration with dancers and performers, amongst others:

- Florence Augendre
- Simone Aughterlony
- Heine Avdal
- Alexander Baczynski-Jenkins
- Milli Bitterli
- Francisco Camacho
- Varinia Canto Vila
- Thomas Conway
- Ugo Dehaes
- Jorge Rodolfo de Hoyos
- Mor Demer
- Christine De Smedt
- Joséphine Evrard
- Davis Freeman
- Eric Grondin
- David Hernandez
- Abraham Hurtado
- Márcio Kerber Canabarro
- Adam Linder
- Antonija Livingstone
- Benoît Lachambre
- Anna MacRae
- Roberto Martínez
- Renan Martins de Oliveira
- Andreas Müller
- Anja Müller
- Kotomi Nishiwaki
- Rachid Ouramdane
- Sonja Pregrad
- Vânia Rovisco
- Roger Sala Reyner
- Maria F. Scaroni
- Yukiko Shinozaki
- Mariana Tengner Barros
- Kristof Van Boven
- Frank James Willens
- Thomas Wodianka
- Sigal Zouk

Other artists that operated as co-creator were a.o.

- Gary Hill (Splayed Mind Out)
- Ann Hamilton (Appetite)
- Magali Desbazeille (Sand Table)
- Jorge Léon (I’m all yours)
- Philipp Gehmacher (Maybe Forever)
- Tim Etchells (Shown and told)

Dramaturges that often collaborated on projects by Meg Stuart are a.o.:

- André Lepecki
- Bettina Masuch
- Jeroen Peeters
- Bart Van den Eynde
- Myriam Van Imschoot

For music and sound design, Meg Stuart often collaborates with:

- Bart Aga
- Brendan Dougherty
- Paul Lemp
- Vincent Malstaf
- Hahn Rowe

Textual contributions for various productions were produced by Tim Etchells. Video, film and other visuals were created by amongst others

- Chris Kondek
- Jorge León
- Vladimir Miller

Costumes were created by a.o.:

- Nathalie Douxfils
- Sofie Durnez
- Nadine Grellinger
- Nina Gundlach
- Claudia Hill
- Tina Kloempken
- Jean-Paul Lespagnard
- Dorothee Loermann

Light design was created by Amongst others:

- Sandra Blatterer
- Marc Dewit
- Åsa Frankenberg
- Michael Hulls
- Jan Maertens

Set designs were created by a.o.:

- Janina Audick
- Doris Dziersk
- Anna Viebrock
- Jozef Wouters
