= Alain Platel =

Belgian choreographer

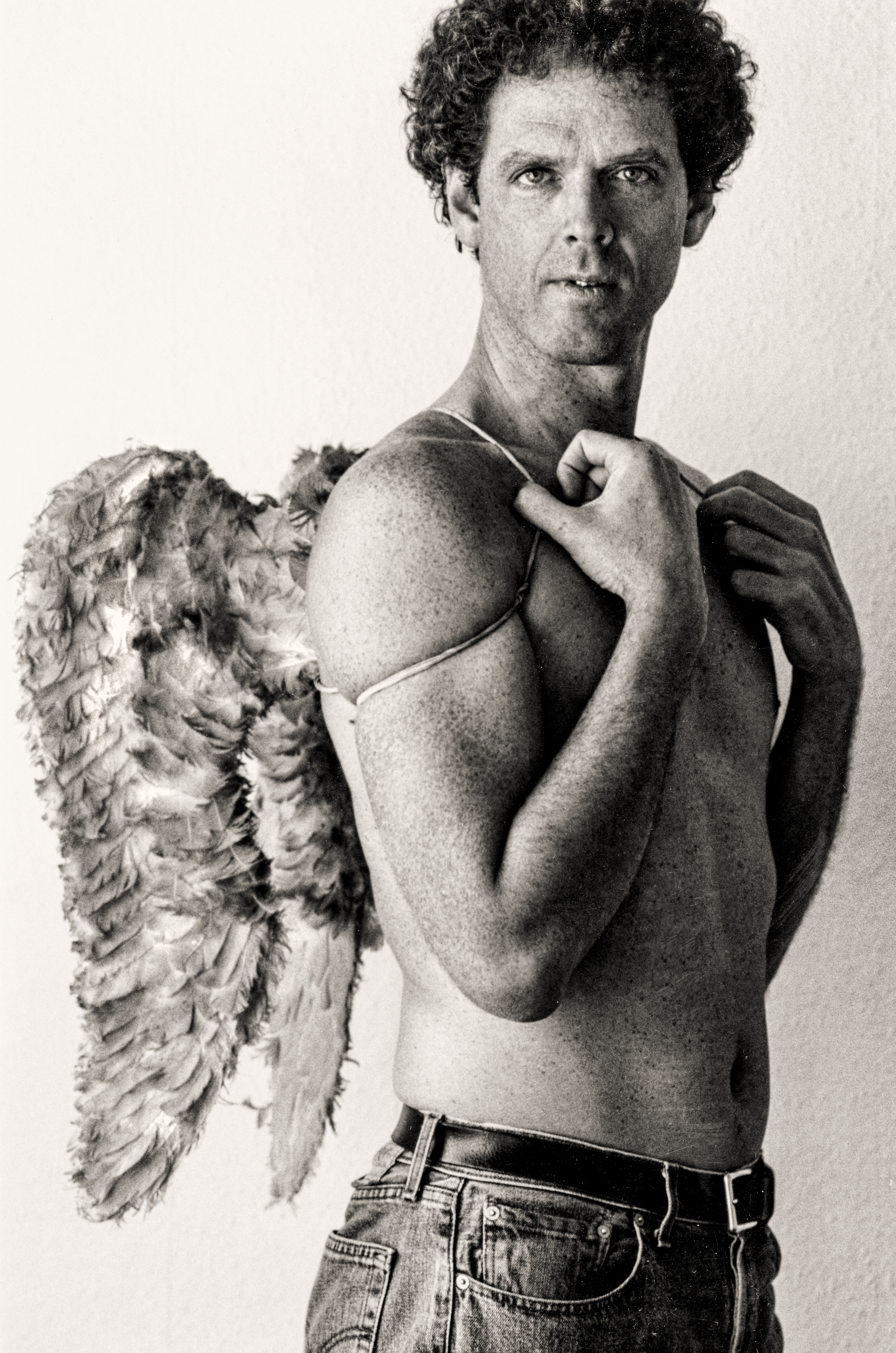
- Alain Platel (2021)
- Born: 1956 (age 69–70); Ghent, Belgium
- Occupations: Choreographer; Director
- Organizations: les ballets C de la B
- Website: https://www.lesballetscdela.be/en/biographies/alain-platel/biography/

Alain Platel (born 9 April 1956) is a Belgian choreographer and director. In 1984, he founded les ballets C de la B, which has been called 'one of the world's most influential dance theatre companies'. Platel came to prominence alongside choreographers like Anne Teresa de Keersmaeker and Wim Vandekeybus in what became known as the Flemish Wave.

== Career ==
=== Early years (1956–1984) ===
Alain Platel was born in Ghent in 1956. In 1969, he was accepted to study at the Hoste-Sabbattini Mime Centre in Ghent. He trained as a remedial educationalist, working with physically and mentally disabled children, but continued to study mime (with Wim Vandekerckhove) and later to take courses at the Paul Grinwis Academy of Ballet. In 1980, he attended a contemporary dance workshop led by the Canadian choreographer Barbara Pearce in Paris, and went on to dance in her production Patchwork. As a director, Platel is self-taught.

=== Les ballets C de la B (1984–2003) ===
Platel founded les ballets C de la B in 1984 on a dare from a former teacher. Along with his sister Pascale and their friend Johan Grimonprez, Platel devised and staged a performance in his loft in Ghent (Stabat Mater). They ironically called themselves 'Les Ballets Contemporains de la Belgique': a name which stuck, albeit in a shortened form. A producer from Antwerp's De Beweeging Festival was present at the performance and invited the newly formed company to perform at the festival. Stabat Mater was the first in a succession of small-scale productions made by les ballets C de la B during the late 1980s and early 1990s, for which Platel shared directing roles with other members of the company.

Les ballets C de la B quickly achieved a modest level of national success, but their major break came in 1993, when a group of international theatre programmers happened to see Platel's Bonjour madame… at a festival in Amsterdam, which led to European tour bookings and a rapidly growing profile on the international dance scene.

Between 1993 and 2003, les ballets C de la B produced an increasing number of larger-scale projects, securing international commissions and state funding from the Flemish government. Run as a collective, the company's performers were encouraged to develop their own choreography and Platel shared directing duties with other members including Hans Van den Broeck, Christine De Smedt and Koen Augustijnen. Platel's productions included three collaborations with the author and theatre-maker Arne Sierens and Ghent-based youth theatre company Victoria (Moeder en kind, Bernadetje, allemaal indiaan). At the same time, Platel began incorporating live musicians within his choreography, in a series of productions constructed around the work of famous composers, beginning with La Tristeza Complice (1995), a co-production with the music theatre company LOD muziektheater, which featured music by Henry Purcell arranged for ten accordionists. This was followed by Iets op Bach (1998): the first of several works based on music by the director's favourite composer, J. S. Bach.

Platel organised the Beste Belgische Danssolo competition between 1995 and 1997, open to solos of any style and designed to discover new talent. The first competition was won by Sidi Larbi Cherkaoui, who subsequently performed in Iets op Bach and would go on to choreograph many of les ballets C de la B's productions.

Shortly after making allemaal indiaan (1999), Platel announced that he would no longer be making productions. Nevertheless, he returned to les ballets C de la B in 2003 with Wolf, commissioned by the Ruhrtriennale, which used music by Mozart and counted fourteen dogs among its performers.

=== Hiatus and return to directing (2003–) ===
During his hiatus from directing, Alain Platel studied sign language and continued to work with amateur and semi-professional performers from varied backgrounds, as documented in his collaborations with the documentarian Sophie Fiennes (Because I Sing, 2002; Ramallah! Ramallah! Ramallah!, 2004). In 2006, Platel directed his own full-length documentary about the dancers of les ballets C de la B, entitled les ballets de ci de là. In the same year, Platel returned to the company as a director, with vsprs (2006), based on Monteverdi's Vespers. This production cemented the director's collaboration with the composer Fabrizio Cassol, which began with the participatory choral project Uit de Bol (2006), and would continue with pitié! (2008), Coup Fatal (2014) and Requiem pour L. (2018).

Since 2006, Platel has continued to direct new work with les ballets C de la B, usually in collaboration with other artists. Nine Finger (2007) was made with actor Benjamin Verdonck and Fumiyo Ikeda of Rosas, while Gardenia (2010) and En avant, marche! (2015) were collaborations with the director Frank Van Laecke and Platel's regular music director Steven Prengels.

Platel currently lives in Ghent.

== Style ==
In his own productions and in his influence on the overall aesthetics of les ballets C de la B, Alain Platel's work is characterised by the extensive, often chaotic combination of dance, theatre, live music, circus and other performance styles. Most of his later productions are structured around live performances of famous classical works, with the musicians being fully involved in the choreography. A particularly grand example of this is C(H)ŒURS (2011), which featured the 72-person chorus of the Teatro Real Madrid performing operatic choruses by Wagner and Verdi. Often, the music is extensively reconstructed or rearranged by Platel's musical collaborators; Coup Fatal (2014) involves a Congolese band performing Baroque arias, while nicht schlafen (2016) combines music by Mahler with African polyphonic chant.

Platel's productions have always involved varied ensembles of performers with different skills, levels of training, backgrounds and body types, including amateurs, children and elderly performers. His work includes large-scale celebrations of amateur performance, such as Because I Sing (2001) which featured sixteen London choirs (reprised in 2006 in Brussels as Uit de Bol/Coup de chœurs), and le Sacre du Printemps (2018): a 'mass choreography' that involved 300 participants from various Ghent dance groups. Gardenia featured a cast of seven drag queens, all aged between 55 and 65 years, inspired by the closing of a Barcelona drag cabaret.

Platel's choreographic work is also concerned with the unconscious: with uncontrolled, unconditioned or arbitrary movements, tics and spasms, which he has described as 'bastard dance'. The movement material explored in projects such as vsprs (2006), Out of Context — for Pina (2010) and tauberbach (2014) was informed by Platel's own experience working with disabled children and adults.

Platel has acknowledged Pina Bausch as an important inspiration, calling himself 'a child of Bausch'.

== Europe Theatre Prize ==
In 2001, he was awarded the Europe Prize Theatrical Realities, in Taormina, with the following motivation:

Alain Platel has pursued an artistic career, rather than a profession or a craft. He is a unique personality, and has no parallel in the world of dance and theatre. His work as a social educator has led him to be deeply concerned with the human condition in his native region: East and West Flanders, and Ghent in particular. He is able to communicate, without artificiality or affectation, all the anxieties, contradictions, desperation, dreams and drives of a fascinating and tragic young generation that he truly empathises with. His productions, from Bonjour Madame... to Tous des Indiens, have been staged throughout Europe, despite the fact that they are (or precisely because they are) completely rooted in the life of the Flemish suburbs. This only goes to show that, by freely combining theatre, music and dance in the "family portraits" he renders so well, Alain Platel has succeeded in revealing the universality of human soul.

== Awards and honours (selection) ==
- 1990: Prix Saint-Denis for Concours, Pièces de Concours at the Concours Choréographique International de Bagnolet
- 1996: Mobil Pegasus Prize for La Tristezza Complice at the International Summer Theatre Festival, Kampnagel, Hamburg
- 1996: Awarded Masque d’Or de la Production Etrangère (Canada) for Moeder en Kind
- 1998: Time Out Live Award (UK) for Iets op Bach
- 1999: Masque d'Or de la Production Etrangère (Canada) for Iets op Bach
- 2001: Europe Prize Theatrical Realities
- 2001: Ubu Prize for the best foreign production (Milan) for allemaal indiaan
- 2001: Platel made Chevalier de l'Ordre des Arts et des Lettres de la République Française
- 2002: Frank Van Acker Prize (City of Bruges)
- 2004: Theatertreffen 3sat Prize for Wolf
- 2007: Kontakt Festival Grand Prix for vsprs
- 2011: Dora Mavor Moore Award (Toronto) for Out of context — for Pina
- 2012: Doctor Honoris Causa from the University of Artois, France
- 2014: Champagne Prize
- 2015: Platel made Commandeur de l’Ordre des Arts et des Lettres de la République Française
- 2015: Flemish Culture Prize for General Cultural Merit
- 2015: Grand Prix de la Danse, Montreal
- 2015: Herald Angel Award for En avant, marche! at the Edinburgh International Festival
- 2016: Doctor Honoris Causa from the University of Ghent
- 2016: Gold Medal of the Royal Flemish Academy of Belgium for Science and Art
- 2017: Catalan Performing Arts Critics Award for nicht schlafen
- 2017: "Prix de la Critique" Special Jury Prize (Belgium) for nicht schlafen

== Productions ==
=== With les ballets C de la B (selection) ===
- Stabat Mater (1984) — with Johan Grimonprez and Pascale Platel
- Lichte Kavalerie (1985) — with Pascale Platel, Kate Vos, Alexander Claeys and Johan Grimonprez
- Mange p’tit coucou (1986) — with Alexander Claeys
- Alchemie (1987)
- Emma (1988) — with Alexander Claeys
- Architectuur als buur (1988)
- O Boom (1989) — with Johan Grimonprez
- Mussen (1990)
- Bonjour madame, comment allez-vous aujourd'hui, il fait beau, il va sans doute pleuvoir, etcetera. (1993)
- Moeder en kind (1995) — with Arne Sierens and Victoria
- La Tristeza Complice (1995) — music by Dick van der Harst, after Henry Purcell
- Bernadetje (1996) — with Arne Sierens and Victoria
- Iets op Bach (1998) — music by J.S. Bach and Prince
- allemaal indiaan (1999) — with Arne Sierens and Victoria
- Wolf (2003) — music by Wolfgang Amadeus Mozart
- Uit de Bol/Coup de cœurs (2006) — with Fabrizio Cassol
- vsprs (2006) — based on Claudio Monteverdi's Vespers
- Nine Finger (2007) – with Fumiyo Ikeda and Benjamin Verdonck
- pitié! (2008) — with Fabrizio Cassol, based on J. S. Bach's St Matthew Passion
- Out of Context - for Pina (2010)
- Gardenia (2010) — with Frank Van Laecke
- C(H)OEURS (2012) — music by Giuseppe Verdi and Richard Wagner
- tauberbach (2014) – music by J. S. Bach
- Coup Fatal (2014) — with Serge Kakudji, Rodriguez Vangama and Fabrizio Cassol
- En avant, marche! (2015) — with Frank Van Laecke and Steven Prengels
- nicht schlafen (2015) — music by Gustav Mahler
- Requiem pour L. (2018) – with Fabrizio Cassol, based on Mozart's Requiem

=== Other projects (selection) ===
- De Beste Belgische Danssolo (1995–1997) — with Victoria
- Because I Sing (2001) — with Orlando Gough
- les ballets de ci de là (2006)
- Nachtschade (2006) – with Victoria
