= Heine Røsdal Avdal =

Norwegian dancer and choreographer

Heine Røsdal Avdal is a Norwegian dancer and choreographer working from Brussels, Belgium.

== Education ==
Heine Avdal studied dance, choreography and video at the Kunsthøgskolen i Oslo (Oslo National Academy of the Arts, 1991-94) and P.A.R.T.S. (Brussels, 1995-96). During his studies at P.A.R.T.S, he choreographed solos and duos that were presented at P.A.R.T.S., Scenehuset (Oslo) and Dixon Place (New York). He worked for different companies in Norway. In 1996-97 he assisted Mikhail Baryshnikov with his solo work at the company White Oak Dance Project in New York.

== Collaboration with Meg Stuart / Damaged Goods ==
Between 1997 and 2001 Heine Avdal was part of Damaged Goods (Brussels), the dance company of the American choreographer Meg Stuart. He was a dancer in Splayed Mind Out (Meg Stuart / Damaged Goods and Gary Hill, 1997), Appetite (Meg Stuart / Damaged Goods and Ann Hamilton, 1998), Sand Table (Meg Stuart / Damaged Goods and Magali Desbazeille, 2000) and Highway 101 (Meg Stuart / Damaged Goods, 2000).

== Own artistic work ==
Since 2000 Heine Avdal has created his own productions. He often does this in collaboration with Yukiko Shinozaki, another former member of Damaged Goods. With his work, he investigates how conventions influence the experience of and moving in public / private space. His projects are often poetic and humorous interventions in unusual, semi-public environments. Based on existing expectations and perceptions about certain spaces, he is looking, through small interventions and shifts, for unexpected perspectives on a space. In addition, he explores how technology is used or can be used, not only to perceive but also to understand both the human body and the daily environment in a new way. His most frequently performed productions are nothing for something (Heine Avdal and Yukiko Shinozaki, 2012), Field Works-office (Heine Avdal and Yukiko Shinozaki, 2010), Field Works-hotel (Heine Avdal and Yukiko Shinozaki, 2009), you are here (Heine Avdal and Yukiko Shinozaki, 2008), Some notes are (Heine Avdal, 2006), Box with hole s (Heine Avdal, 2004) and terminal (Heine Avdal, 2001).

== fieldworks ==
Originally, Heine Avdals created his own artistic work under the wings of deepblue, a production structure he shared with Yukiko Shinozaki and sound artist Christoph De Boeck. Since 2012, he does this under the wings of fieldworks vzw (Brussels), an organization that focuses on the creation, production, distribution and promotion of Heine Avdal and Yukiko Shinozaki's work. Their extensive range of productions already toured in a wide range of countries in Europe and Asia, but also in the United States, Cuba and Lebanon.

== Collaboration with others ==
In 2002-2003, Heine Avdal, together with Mette Edvardsen, Liv Hanne Haugen and Lawrence Malstaf, also created the performance/installation Sauna in Exile .

== Productions ==
With fieldworks vzw:

- Cast off Skin (Heine Avdal and Yukiko Shinozaki, 2000)
- terminal (Heine Avdal, 2001)
- terminal video (Heine Avdal, 2002)
- Closer (Heine Avdal and Yukiko Shinozaki, 2003)
- Box with holes (Heine Avdal, 2004)
- IN_LINE (Heine Avdal, 2005)
- Some notes are (Heine Avdal, 2006)
- drop a line (Heine Avdal, 2007)
- installation you are here (Heine Avdal and Yukiko Shinozaki, 2010)
- you are here (Heine Avdal and Yukiko Shinozaki, 2008)
- Field Works-hotel (Heine Avdal and Yukiko Shinozaki, 2009)
- Field Works-office (Heine Avdal and Yukiko Shinozaki, 2010)
- Borrowed Landscape (Heine Avdal and Yukiko Shinozaki, 2011)
- nothing's for something (Heine Avdal and Yukiko Shinozaki, 2012)
- The seventh floor of the world (Heine Avdal, Yukiko Shinozaki and Sachiyo Takahashi, 2013)
- distant voices (Heine Avdal and Yukiko Shinozaki, 2014)
- as if nothing has been spinning around for something to remember (Heine Avdal and Yukiko Shinozaki, 2014)
- carry on (Heine Avdal and Yukiko Shinozaki, 2015)
- THE OTHEROOM (Heine Avdal, Yukiko Shinozaki and Rolf Wallin, 2016)
- unannounced (Heine Avdal and Yukiko Shinozaki, 2017)

With Meg Stuart / Damaged Goods:

- Splayed Mind Out (Meg Stuart / Damaged Goods and Gary Hill, 1997)
- appetite (Meg Stuart / Damaged Goods and Ann Hamilton, 1998)
- sand table (Meg Stuart / Damaged Goods and Magali Desbazeille, 2000)
- Highway 101 (Meg Stuart / Damaged Goods, 2000)

With others:

- Sauna in Exile (Heine Avdal, Mette Edvardsen, Liv Hanne Haugen and Lawrence Malstaf, 2002-2003)

== Sources ==
- Kunstenpunt - Persons - Heine Avdal according to the Flemish Arts Institute
- Sceneweb - Persons - Heine Avdal according to the Performing Arts Hub Norway
- Biography of Heine Avdal on the website of fieldworks
