= The Cholmondeleys =

The Cholmondeleys were a London-based, all-female contemporary dance company, described by Arts Council England as "one of the leading contemporary dance companies in Britain," presenting work that "is diverse, witty and instantly recognisable." Formed in 1984, the company was disbanded in 2011.

== History ==
The Cholmondeleys were formed by Lea Anderson (later Artistic Director/Choreographer), Teresa Barker and Gaynor Coward in 1984 after they graduated from the Laban Centre for Movement and Dance (today Trinity Laban).

In 1988, Anderson established an all-male company The Featherstonehaughs.

In 2011, both companies were reported to be disbanding at the end of the year, due to the loss of Arts Council grants.

== Work ==
Works choreographed by Anderson for The Cholmondeleys include:

- Flesh And Blood (1989/1997)
- Cold Sweat (1990)
- Cross Channel (1991, with the Featherstonehaughs)
- Walky Talky (1992)
- Metalcholica (1994)
- Car (1995/96)
