= The Featherstonehaughs =

London-based all-male contemporary dance company

The Featherstonehaughs are a London-based, all-male contemporary dance company, described by Arts Council England as "one of the leading contemporary dance companies in Britain," presenting work that "is diverse, witty and instantly recognisable."

== History ==
The Featherstonehaughs company was formed by Lea Anderson (now Artistic Director/Choreographer) in 1988, complementing The Cholmondeleys, an all-female company formed four years earlier.

Works created by Anderson for The Featherstonehaughs include:

- The Show (1990)
- The Featherstonehaughs’ Big Feature (1991)
- Cross Channel (1991, with the Cholmondeleys)
- The Featherstonehaughs Immaculate Conception (1992)
- The Bends (1994)
- The Featherstonehaughs Go Las Vegas (1995)
- The Featherstonehaughs Draw On The Sketchbooks Of Egon Schiele (1997) (2010)
- Edits (2010)

One of the founding members of the Featherstonehaughs (1990–1997) is movement director Dan O'Neill who has worked extensively in opera at the Royal Opera House and the Grange Opera among others. He has worked in film (The Girl with All The Gifts, 2016), and on the first three series of Humans, a Kudos/AMC production (2015, 2016, 2018) designing the movement of the robots.
