= Yukiko Shinozaki =

Japanese dancer and choreographer

Yukiko Shinozaki is a Japanese dancer and choreographer working from Brussels, Belgium.

== Education ==
Yukiko Shinozaki studied classical ballet in Tokyo, and modern dance at Portland State University (Oregon), where she also obtained a B.A. In psychology. In 1992 she moved to New York, where she worked as a freelance dancer and showed her own solo work.

== Collaboration with Meg Stuart / Damaged Goods ==
In 1997, Yukiko Shinozaki came to Belgium to work for Damaged Goods (Brussels), the dance company of the American choreographer Meg Stuart. She was a dancer in Splayed Mind Out (Meg Stuart / Damaged Goods and Gary Hill, 1997), Appetite (Meg Stuart / Damaged Goods and Ann Hamilton, 1998), Sand Table (Meg Stuart / Damaged Goods and Magali Desbazeille, 2000) and Highway 101 (Meg Stuart / Damaged Goods, 2000), and the assistant choreographer on Remote (Meg Stuart / Damaged Goods, 1997).

== Own artistic work ==
Since 2000, Yukiko Shinozaki focuses on her own productions. She often does this in collaboration with Heine Avdal, another former member of Damaged Goods. She regards artistic collaborations, with both Heine Avdal and others, as an important factor in her work. The confrontation and encounter with different performers and situations delivers elements that integrate into her work, which focuses on the inner complexity and contradiction of the body. An important part of her movement language is the transformation process. Familiar actions gradually transform through subtle shifts and manipulations into an unusual world. Her most frequently performed productions are nothing's for something (Heine Avdal and Yukiko Shinozaki, 2012), Field Works-office (Heine Avdal and Yukiko Shinozaki, 2010), Field Works-hotel (Heine Avdal and Yukiko Shinozaki, 2009), you are here (Heine Avdal and Yukiko Shinozaki, 2008) and Inner Horizon (co-creation with Christelle Fillod, 2005). Yukiko Shinozaki also assisted Heine Avdal on his productions terminal (2001), Box with holes (2004), IN_LINE (2005) and Some notes are (2006).

== Productions ==
With fieldworks:

- Cast off Skin (Yukiko Shinozaki and Heine Avdal, 2000)
- Closer (Yukiko Shinozaki and Heine Avdal, 2003)
- Breaking through the roof of its house (Yukiko Shinozaki and Christelle Fillod, 2005)
- Inner horizon (co-creation with Christelle Fillod, 2005)
- hibi (2007, Yukiko Shinozaki and Un Yamada)
- you are here (Yukiko Shinozaki and Heine Avdal, 2008)
- Field Works-hotel (Yukiko Shinozaki and Heine Avdal, 2009)
- Field Works-office (Yukiko Shinozaki and Heine Avdal, 2010)
- installation you are here (Yukiko Shinozaki and Heine Avdal, 2010)
- Borrowed Landscape (Yukiko Shinozaki and Heine Avdal, 2011)
- nothing's for something (Yukiko Shinozaki and Heine Avdal, 2012)
- The seventh floor of the world (Yukiko Shinozaki, Heine Avdal and Sachiyo Takahashi, 2013)
- distant voices (Yukiko Shinozaki and Heine Avdal, 2014)
- as if nothing has been spinning around for something to remember (Yukiko Shinozaki and Heine Avdal, 2014)
- carry on (Yukiko Shinozaki and Heine Avdal, 2015)
- THE OTHEROOM (Yukiko Shinozaki, Heine Avdal and Rolf Wallin, 2016)
- unannounced (Yukiko Shinozaki and Heine Avdal, 2017)

With Meg Stuart / Damaged Goods:

- Splayed Mind Out (Meg Stuart / Damaged Goods and Gary Hill, 1997)
- Remote (Meg Stuart / Damaged Goods, 1997)
- appetite (Meg Stuart / Damaged Goods and Ann Hamilton, 1998)
- sand table (Meg Stuart / Damaged Goods and Magali Desbazeille, 2000)
- Highway 101 (Meg Stuart / Damaged Goods, 2000)

== Sources ==
- Kunstenpunt - Persons - Yukiko Shinozaki according to Kunstenpunt
- Biography of Yukiko Shinozaki on the website of fieldworks
