= Lea Anderson =

British choreographer and artistic director

Lea Anderson is a British choreographer and artistic director. She co-founded The Cholmondeleys and The Featherstonehaughs dance companies with Teresa Barker and Gaynor Coward, at which she has choreographed over 100 works.

She was appointed Member of the Order of the British Empire (MBE) in the 2002 Birthday Honours.

Anderson's style has been described as " ...this most accessible of choreographers (feeds) not on the esoteric and obscure, but on the readily available debris of media culture." The works she has choreographed have been described as "Political without being dogmatic, irreverent but not lightweight..."

== Career ==
Anderson graduated from the Laban Centre, prior to that she attended St. Martins College of Art and Design as a visual arts student, but decided eventually to focus on dance.

Works made for The Cholmondeleys include: Flesh And Blood (1989/1997), Cold Sweat (1990), Walky Talky (1992), Metalcholica (1994), Car (1995/96)

Works made for The Featherstonehaughs include: The Show (1990), The Featherstonehaughs’ Big Feature (1991), The Featherstonehaughs Immaculate Conception (1992), The Bends (1994), The Featherstonehaughs Go Las Vegas (1995), The Featherstonehaughs Draw On The Sketchbooks Of Egon Schiele (1997) (2010), Edits (2010)

Work made with The Cholmondeleys and The Featherstonehaughs include: Russian Roulette (2008), Yippeee!!! (2006), Double Take (2004), 1 1/2 – The Club Shows (2002), 3 (2001), The Cholmondeleys, The Featherstonehaughs And The Victims Of Death In Smithereens (1999), Out On The Windy Beach (1998), Precious (1993), Birthday (1992), Cross Channel (1991), Flag (1988).

Anderson disbanded the Cholmondeleys and Featherstonehaughs companies in 2011 but continues to choreograph including Ladies and Gentlemen (2015) and Los amores de Venus y Marte (2018).

As of 2023 Anderson has started to reconstruct earlier Cholmondeleys work.
