= Performing Arts Research and Training Studios =

Location
- Brussels Capital-Region; Forest 1190; Belgium; 50°49′5.279″N 4°19′27.365″E

Information
- Other name: P.A.R.T.S.
- School type: Dance school
- Founded: 30 June 1994
- Founders: Anne Teresa De Keersmaeker; Bernard Foccroulle
- Director: Anne Teresa De Keersmaeker
- Campuses: Rosas Performance Space
- Website: https://www.parts.be/

Performing Arts Research and Training Studios (P.A.R.T.S.) is an international school for contemporary dance that is located in Vorst, in the Brussels-Capital Region of Belgium.

== History ==
PARTS was founded in 1995 by the Belgian choreographer Anne Teresa De Keersmaeker and Bernard Foccroulle; the latter was director of the National Opera De Munt.

De Keersmaeker and Foccroulle initiated PARTS to fill a gap in professional training for dance, with focus on providing a pedagogical platform for contemporary dance in Belgium.

Anne Teresa de Keersmaeker expressed the spirit of PARTS as follows: “I cannot teach anyone to dance. One learns to dance oneself. But perhaps I can give them a desire, an experience, create a space for challenges.”

The first students of PARTS graduated in 1998, and by 2015, there were approximately 860 students, teachers and staff had been involved with the school since its start in 1995.

In 2010, PARTS received the Silver Lion for Dance at the 7th International Festival of Contemporary Dance of the Venice Biennale.

In 2013, PARTS developed a partnership for higher education in contemporary dance with HES-SO/Manufacture, the High School of Performing Arts at the University of Applied Sciences and Arts Western Switzerland (Lausanne).

== Pedagogical curriculum ==
Inspired in the model Mudra by choreographer Maurice Béjart PARTS functions as a meeting place for different generations of dancers and choreographers from all over the world.

Anne Teresa De Keersmaeker designed the original pedagogical curriculum when the program lasted three years. In 2000, the program was extended with the option to specialize as a dancer or as a choreographer. The pedagogical curriculum currently consists of two independent parts called cycles. The first part is the Training Cycle which lasts three years and forms the basis of the course. The second part is the subsequent Research Studios, which lasts two years.

The program pays attention the repertoire of Rosas, the dance company of Anne Teresa De Keersmaeker. Each year students learn one complete Rosas choreography, in addition to other contemporary choreographers who are addressed, such as Pina Bausch, William Forsythe and Trisha Brown.

== Financial support ==
Since 1998, PARTS has received grants from the Ministry of Education of the Flemish Community of Belgium. From 2002, this is arranged through contractual agreements that are renewed five-yearly. The school currently receives additional funding from the network [DNA] Departures and Arrivals, that is co-financed by the European Commission (Creative Europe Program). Between 2001 and 2014 the school received additional funding from the DÉPARTS, that was also co-financed by the European Commission.

== Notable alumni ==
Graduated students who have made an important contribution on the contemporary arts are:

- Heine Avdal
- Eleanor Bauer
- Sidi Larbi Cherkaoui
- Mette Ingvartsen
- Kaya Kołodziejczyk
- Salva Sanchis
- Ula Sickle
- Andros Zins-Browne

== Book publications about PARTS ==
- Steven de Belder (ed.), Theo van Rompay (ed.), Documenting 10 years of contemporary dance education, P.A.R.T.S., 2006, 211 p.

This book was conceived on the occasion of the 10th anniversary of P.A.R.T.S..

- Theo van Rompay (ed.), 20 years - 50 portraits, P.A.R.T.S., 2016, 408 p., ISBN 978-90-902-9748-4

This book was conceived on the occasion of the 20th anniversary of P.A.R.T.S.. It comprises portraits of 50 P.A.R.T.S. students and an overview of the 860 students, teachers and staff who together have built out the school.

== Sources ==
- Kunstenpunt - Organisations - P.A.R.T.S. according to the Flemish Arts Institute
