= Big Art Group =

Experimental performance ensemble

Big Art Group is a New York City-based experimental performance ensemble that uses language and media to push formal boundaries of theatre, film and visual arts to create culturally transgressive works. It has publicly declared its goal as the desire to develop innovative performances using original text, technology, and experimental methods of communication.

== Development ==
Founded by director Caden Manson and playwright Jemma Nelson in 1999, Big Art Group has produced original works, CLEARCUT, catastrophe (1999), The Balladeer (2000), Shelf Life (2001), Flicker (2002), House of No More (2004), Dead Set #2 and #3 (2006-7),"The Sleep", "The Imitation", "The People" (2007), "S.O.S." (2008), "Cityrama" and "Broke House". The first two works, Clearcut Catastrophe and The Balladeer, explored the development of new vocabularies for performance blending film and theatrical references and trained the ensemble in physically rigorous methods of stagecraft. Clearcut Catastrophe fused ideas from Chekhov's Three Sisters and the documentary Grey Gardens through methods of improvisation. These experiments evolved into a trilogy of works: Shelf Life, Flicker and House of No More. In these pieces, Manson invented an integrated spectacle which he dubbed ‘Real-Time Film’, a hybrid of film and theatre in which actors recombined formal ideas of performance through the use of simultaneous acting on stage and for live video using complex choreography, puppetry, and autobiography. He referred to the techniques of accomplishing filmic language such as cuts, pans, and zooms as treating "the actor as technology."

Thematically, the trilogy began with an acidic critique of consumerism with Shelf Life, which also marks author Jemma Nelson's writing debut. The sister piece, Flicker, used two storylines to create a linked examination of violence and commodity. The trilogy concluded with House of No More, which dismantled ideas of theatrical narrative, and attacked the idea of spectacle through an investigation of theatre as an analogy for worldbuilding.

In 2006 the company began a series of experimental video art, musical collaborations and reality performances, Dead Set #2 and #3, "The Sleep","The Imitation" and The People. Dead Set #2 and #3 continued Big Art Group's experimentation with live theatre and video, set and costume design to comment on themes of trauma and popular culture. The People was an expansion of real-time film that moved the theatre to the street, combining local participants, documentary research and site-specific creations and - fusing avant-garde performance with community expression. Retelling a contemporary version of the Oresteia, The People was simultaneously played and live-projected and broadcast into the public square of the Italian town of Polverigi.

"S.O.S." followed in 2008, opening at the Wiener Festwochen in Austria and appearing in New York at The Kitchen. Combining a large scale video installation, dense text, sound, and fast pace, the play explored ideas of saturation and sacrifice in contemporary society. The text of the play was published in Yale's Theatre Magazine (Vol. 40, No. 2, 2010).

Caden Manson has been recognized as a Pew Fellow for his work with Big Art Group. Major funding for the company include grants received from the Rockefeller Multi-Arts Production fund, The Greenwall Foundation, the Foundation for Contemporary Art and the Florence Gould Foundation. In the United States, Big Art Group has performed at such venues as Performance Space 122, The Kitchen, The Wexner Center for the Arts, The Walker Art Center, and REDCAT. Performers include Heather Litteer, Farrad Mullins, David Commander, Justin Vivian Bond, and Theo Kogan. Their work is also in the permanent collection of the Yale Drama Library.

== Production history ==
=== CLEARCUT, catastrophe! ===
1999 Kraine Theatre, NYC

=== The Balladeer ===
2000 Kraine Theatre, NYC

=== Shelf Life (Premiere - The Kraine Theatre, NYC 2001) ===
2004 Kaiitheatre (Brussels, Belgium), Hebbel am Ufer (Berlin), Festpielhaus Hellerau (Dresden, Germany)
2003 Pan Pan Theatre Symposium (Dublin, Ireland), The Walker Arts Center (Minneapolis, Minnesota), Fresh Terrain/PS122/UT (Austin, Texas), The Wexner Center For The Arts (Columbus, Ohio), The Warhol Museum (Pittsburgh, Pennsylvania), Künstlerhaus Mousonturm (Frankfurt, Germany), Sommerszene (Salzburg, Austria)

=== Flicker (Premiere Performance Space 122, NYC 2002) ===
2005 In Motion Festival (Barcelona, Spain), RED/CAT (Los Angeles, California, US), Teatro Central (Sevilla, Spain), VEO Festival (Valencia, Spain), Teatro Canovas (Málaga, Spain), Teatro Alhambra (Granada, Spain), Teatro La Fenice (Senigallia, Italy), Trafó (Budapest, Hungary), STUK (Leuven, Belgium)
2004 New Territories Festival (Glasgow, Scotland), Emilia Romagna Teatro (Modena, Italy), Sommerszene Festival (Salzburg, Austria)
2003 The Via Festival (Maubeuge, France), Inteatro Polverigi (Polverigi, Italy), Zürcher Theater Spektakel (Zurich, Switzerland), La Bâtie-Festival de Genève (Geneva, Switzerland), De (internationale) Keuze van de Rotterdamse Schouwburg (Rotterdam, Netherlands), Le Vie de Festival (Rome, Italy), SpielArt Festival (Munich, Germany), Hebbel Theater (Berlin), Mettre en Scène (Rennes, France)
2002 Théâtre Garonne (Toulouse, France), Festival d'Automne (Paris, France), Théâtre de Lorient (Brittany, France)

=== House of No More (Premiere Performance Space 122, NYC 2004) ===
2005 Dance Theater Workshop (NYC), Hebbel Theater (Berlin), Théâtre Garonne/TNT (Toulouse, France), Festival d'Automne à Paris, Le Manège (Maubeuge, France), Le Vie de Festival (Rome), La Rose Des Vents (Villeneuve d'Asq, France), Wexner Center (Columbus, Ohio), Art Rock Festival (Saint-Brieuc, France), Festival de Otoño (Madrid), Teatro La Fenice (Sinigalia, Italy), Semaines Internationales de la Marionnette (Neuchâtel, Switzerland), Théâtre de Nîmes (Nîmes, France)
2006 Temps d'Image at L'Usine C (Montreal, Canada), Festival Mois Multi (Québec, Canada), Donau Festival (Krems, Austria), Scene Festival (Salzburg, Austria)

=== Dead Set #2 (Premiere Hebbel Theater, Berlin Germany 2006) ===
2006 La Comète (Châlons-en-Champagne, France), Théâtre d'Angoulême (Angoulême, France), Festival d'Automne à Paris (Paris, France)

=== Dead Set #3 (Premiere The Kitchen, NYC 2007) ===
2007 deSignel (Antwerp, Belgium), Künstlerhaus Mousonturm (Frankfurt, Germany), Donau Festival (Krems, Austria)

=== The People ===
2007 Inteatro Polverigi (Polverigi, Italy)
2008 Theater der Welt Festival (Halle, Germany)

=== S.O.S. ===
2008 Wiener Festwochen (Vienna, Austria), Théâtre Garonne (Toulouse, France) 2009 Temps d’Image Festival (Montreal, Canada), The Kitchen (NYC, USA), REDCAT (Los Angeles, USA), Yerba Buena Arts Center (San Francisco, USA), Prospettiva 09 (Turin, Italy)
