= Swiss Dance Awards =

Former Swiss dance award

The Swiss Dance Awards are a former set of awards presented biennially, since 2021 merged with the Swiss Theatre Awards as the Swiss Performing Arts Awards.

== History ==
The Swiss Dance Awards were created as a federal support to dance, introduced as part of the Federal law of encouragement to culture. They were created in 2012 by the Swiss Confederation, as a measure to encourage the dance world. Since 2013 the Federal Dance Jury, the prizes are awarded every two years in collaboration with the Federal Office of Culture (FOC).

It pursued and furthered the objectives of the Swiss Dance and Choreography prize (2002–2011). The [Swiss Confederation] having taken up the prize as recognition and support in its objectives.

The first ceremony of this award took place in the Theatre l'Equilibre in Fribourg in 2013. The awards were presented biennially by the Federal Office of Culture (FOC) from 2013 to 2019. In 2021, they were merged with the Swiss Theatre Awards, as the Swiss Performing Arts Awards, and are presented annually at a joint ceremony.

== Categories ==
The Swiss Grand Award for Dance pays tribute to an artistic career and is the top prize of 40,000 francs awarded by the Federal Dance Jury. An equal amount is assigned to the Special Dance Award as a recompense for an exceptional contribution in the fields of mediation, documentation or cultural policy. As part of the "Current Dance Creation" competition the jury allocates four Swiss Dance Awards each of 25,000 francs. The June Johnson Prize is given in collaboration with the Stanley Thomas Johnson Foundation and rewards the upcoming dance generation. An Award of 25,000 francs is endowed to Outstanding Female and Male Dancers for their performing role.

== Dance Awards Laureates ==
=== Swiss Grand Award for Dance ===
- 2019: La Ribot
- 2017: Noemi Lapzeson
- 2015: Gilles Jobin
- 2013: Martin Schläpfer

=== Swiss Dance Awards ===
==== 2019 ====
- Flow - Compagnie Linga & Keda
- Hate me, tender - Teresa Vittucci
- Speechless Voices - Compagnie Greffe/Cindy Van Acker
- Vicky setzt Segel - Company Mafalda/Teresa Rotemberg

==== 2017 ====
- Creature-József Trefeli & Gábor Varga
- iFeel3-*MELK Prod./Marco Berrettini
- inaudible-ZOO/Thomas Hauert
- Le Récital des Posture-Yasmine Hugonnet

==== 2015 ====
- Souffle - DA MOTUS! / Brigitte Meuwly and Antonio Bühler
- Requiem - Tanzcompagnie Konzert Theater Bern / Nanine Linning
- bits C 128Hz - miR Compagnie / Béatrice Goetz
- Orthopädie or to be - Kilian Haselbeck/Meret Schlegel

==== 2013 ====
- Sideways Rain - Alias Cie / Guilherme Botelho
- From B to B - Thomas Hauert/ZOO et Àngels Margarit/Cia Mudances
- Disabled Theater - Theater HORA / Jérôme Bel
- Diffraction - Cie Greffe / Cindy Van Acker

=== June Johnson Dance Price ===
- 2019: Unplush / Marion Zurbach
- 2017: Hyperion – Higher States Part 2 - Antibodies/Kiriakos Hadjiioannou
- 2015: Requiem for a piece of meat - 3art3 company, Daniel Hellmann
- 2013: Dark Side Of The Moon - Asphalt Piloten, Anna Anderegg

=== Special Dance Award ===
- 2019: Dominique Martinoli
- 2017: AIEP Avventure in Elicottero Prodotti
- 2015: Claude Ratzé/ADC Genf
- 2013: Théâtre Sévelin 36

=== Outstanding feminine and masculine dancers ===
- 2019: Marie-Caroline Hominal / Edouard Hue
- 2017: Marthe Krummenacher / Tamara Bacci
- 2015: Simone Aughterlony / Ioannis Mandafounis
- 2013: Yen Han / Foofwa d’Imobilité
