= Tanz im August =

Berlin dance festival

- Genre: contemporary dance
- Begins: around August
- Frequency: annual
- Location: Berlin
- Inaugurated: 1988; 38 years ago
- Patron: Hebbel am Ufer
- People: Nele Hertling; Virve Sutinen
- Website: www.tanzimaugust.de

Tanz im August ([tant͡s ɪm aʊ̯ˈɡʊst]; "Dance in August") is an annual festival for contemporary dance in Berlin. It was founded by Nele Hertling in West Berlin in 1988, and is now presented by the Hebbel am Ufer (HAU) theatre company on various stages in Berlin. It presents companies from all over the world with their new choreography, aesthetics and formats, new projects by Berlin artists, collaboration with international guests, and co-production for world premieres and German premieres. Virve Sutinen has been artistic director from 2014.

== History ==
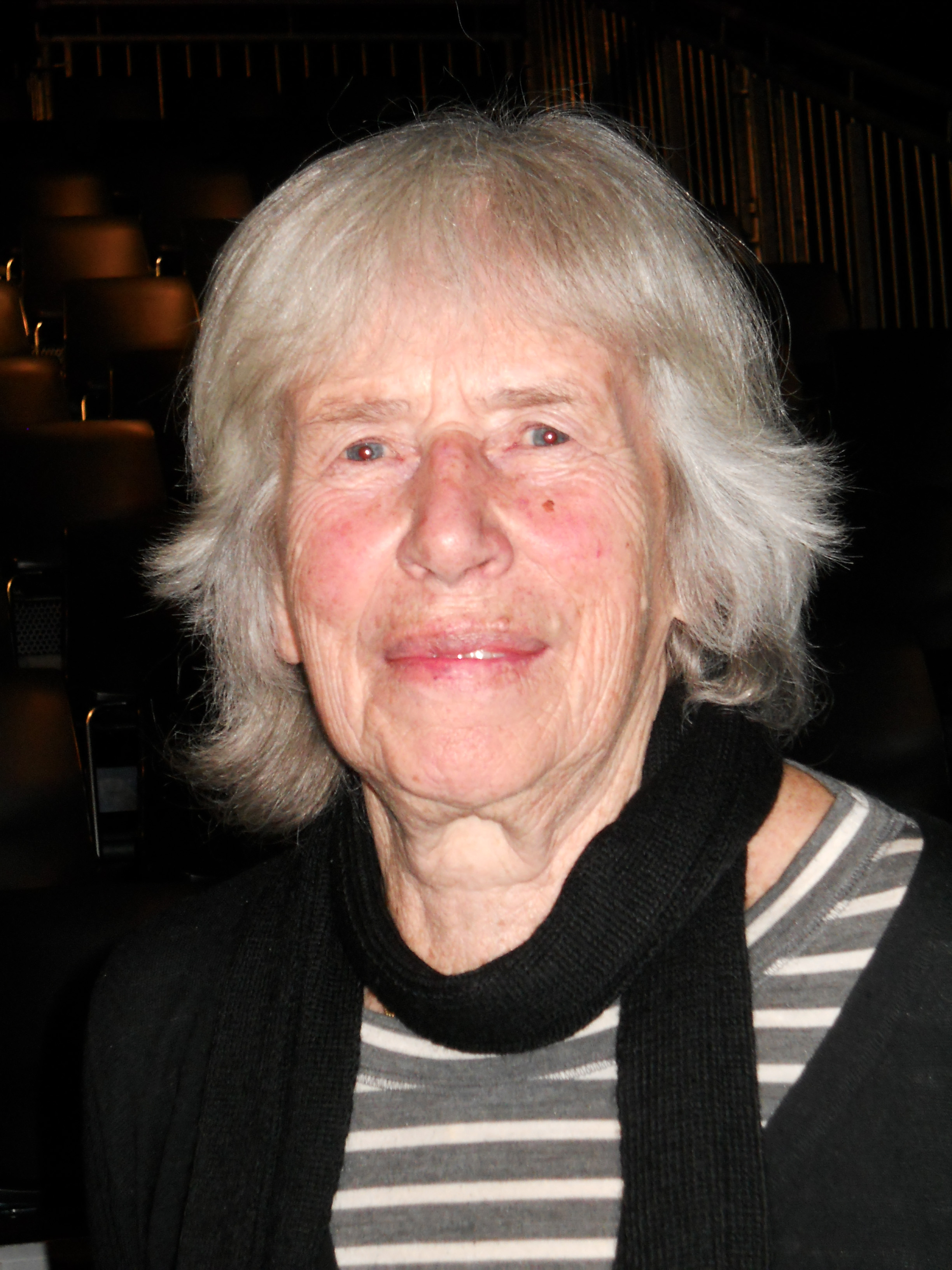
Nele Hertling in 2012

Tanz im August was founded as an international festival for contemporary dance by Nele Hertling in 1988, then in West Berlin. The festival developed to an annual festival of several weeks around August. It brings notable companies from all over the world together in Berlin, with new choreography, aesthetics and formats. The festival also presents new projects by Berlin artists, collaboration with international guests and the co-production of world premieres and German premieres.

The festival is now presented by the Hebbel am Ufer (HAU) theatre company. The festival uses several venues: the three stages of HAU, and varying other stages throughout Berlin, including the Haus der Berliner Festspiele, the Sophiensäle, the Radialsystem, the Volksbühne, the Deutsches Theater Berlin, the "Kindl Centre for Contemporary Art" and the Schaubühne am Lehniner Platz.

Tanz im August is funded by the Capital Cultural Fund. Since 2014, Virve Sutinen from Sweden has been the artistic director.

== Productions ==
Numerous formats are fixed components of the festival program. Since 2016, the Bibliothek im August (Library in August) project at the Schaubühne am Lehniner Platz (HAU2) has made books available that festival artists recommended as having influenced their work and thought. The 31st edition in 2019 featured 70 performances of 31 productions at eleven different venues with 160 artists from 15 countries. The 2020 edition took place in a modified form due to the COVID-19 pandemic. Instead of a stage program, an extended online program was offered.

Tanz im August has been publishing a Magazin im August since 2014.

=== Artistic direction ===
- 1989–2003: Nele Hertling
- 2003–2007: Ulrike Becker, Matthias Lilienthal, Bettina Masuch, André Thériault
- 2007–2008: Ulrike Becker, Matthias Lilienthal, Marion Ziemann, Bettina Masuch, André Thériault
- 2009–2013: Ulrike Becker, Pirkko Husemann, Matthias Lilienthal, André Thériault, Marion Ziemann
- 2013: Bettina Masuch
- 2014–2022: Virve Sutinen
- 2023–2027: Ricardo Carmona

=== Artists ===
Artists and companies featured at Tanz im August have included Dominique Bagouet, Tanztheater Wuppertal Pina Bausch, Jérôme Bel, Bruno Beltrão / Grupo de Rua, Rosemary Butcher, Roberto Castello, Nora Chipaumire, Michael Clark Company, Cloud Gate Dance Theatre, Martha Graham Dance Company, Trajal Harrell, Deborah Hay, Anne Teresa De Keersmaeker, María La Ribot, Faustin Linyekula, Constanza Macras' Dorky Park, Lemi Ponifasio, Eszter Salamon, Wayne McGregor, Meg Stuart and Sasha Waltz. Agnietė Lisičkinaitė and Igor Shugaleev

=== Retrospectives ===
Since 2015, Tanz im August has shown a retrospective of an important living artist every other year, resulting in a publication on their life and work.

- 2015 – Rosemary Butcher
- 2017 – La Ribot
- 2019 – Deborah Hay

=== 30th anniversary ===
In 2018, Tanz im August celebrated its 30th anniversary. In addition to the festival events, journalist Claudia Henne compiled the festival's production history in an archive, which is available in the Tanz im August Online Magazin.
