= Caden Manson =

American performance director

- Writing career
- Notable works: Shelf Life, Flicker, Dead Set, House of No More, SOS, The People, Cinema Fury, Opacity
- Website: bigartgroup.com

Caden Manson is the co-founder and director of Big Art Group, a performance ensemble based in New York City. Dedicated to advancing the boundaries of contemporary performance, Manson has expanded the field through their use of digital media, creative interdisciplinary collaborations, and teaching. Manson is the Editor in Chief and co-curator at Contemporary Performance Network, a community organizing platform and social network dedicated to facilitating collaboration among artists, presenters, scholars and festivals. They are the co-Artistic director of the Special Effects festival, an experimental performance festival which premiered in January 2014. They were the Head of the John Wells Directing Program at Carnegie Mellon University from 2014-2019 and is currently the Director of the Undergraduate and Graduate Theatre Program at Sarah Lawrence College in New York.

== Education ==
A Texas native, Manson attended University of Texas at Austin, where they earned awards in acting and a Presidential scholarship that supported their Bachelor of Arts in Theatre. Manson moved to New York in 1995, and in 1999, along with Jemma Nelson, they founded Big Art Group. Initially a small underground performance group, the company has since burgeoned into an internationally appreciated and critically acclaimed ensemble.

== Direction ==
Manson has been responsible for the direction, co-creation, set and media design of Big Art Group's productions since its initial original work, CLEARCUT Catastrophe in 1999. Since CLEARCUT, the company has produced 22 original works with repeated tours. The People, a serial production adaptively rewritten for each city it is presented in has enjoyed success in Polverigi, Halle, San Francisco, Portland, and most recently New York.

Manson's work is characterized by its intense visual spectacle, savvy blending of video and live acting to produce self-reflective commentary on its own genre, and technical sophistication. At its birth, Manson envisioned Big Art Group as a means to, 'aggressively attack the boundaries of performance and art through its experimentation with structure, medium and process." Big Art Group's unique integration of live acting and video, known as Real Time Film, was pioneered and titled by Manson himself, and has remained a characteristic element of the artist's work, revisited and developed in new productions. Much of Big Art Group's work blends elements of popular culture and current events with scenes inspired by literature or Classical mythology. Manson's work seeks to actively engage and challenge its audience and to confront expectations constructed by traditional theatre:

"Unlike traditional theatrical performance, Big Art Group's extended mediated performances reposition viewers into active editors, challenging audience members to problem-solve complex issues of sexuality, race, narrative and truth as a theatrical mirror to the process of navigation through contemporary society."

In an interview with The Village Voice, Manson remarked on the political quality of Big Art's serial project, The People, and on their broader goal of encouraging popular engagement in art, politics, and thought: "For me, culture is a space for critical thought," says Manson. "We're not really making a show, we're making a space for people to think."

== Fellowships, honors and awards ==
Manson has been honored with multiple funding grants from Rockefeller Foundation's Multi Arts Production Fund, fellowships from The Foundation of Contemporary Art, Pew Fellowship in the Arts, MidAtlantic Art Fellowship/ PennsylvaniaCouncil on the Arts, and MacDowell Colony.

=== Fellowships and honors ===
MacDowell Colony (2011)
Pew Fellowship in the Arts (2002)
Foundation for Contemporary Arts Grants to Artists award (2001)
Named Top 10 New Theatrical Production's for Flicker in Italy by Corriere della Sera (2005)

=== Funding and awarded support ===
Carnegie Mellon The Berkman Pro-Seed Fund (2017)
Carnegie Mellon Fund for Research and Creativity Award (2016)
National Performance Network Performance Residency (2012)
New York State Council on the Arts Grant (2010, 2011)
Rockefeller Foundation's Multi Arts Production Fund (2003, 2009)
Mid Atlantic Arts Fellowship/Pennsylvania Council on the Arts for general creation in the 2009/2010 creation cycle
Kulturstiftung des Bundes (German Federal Cultural Foundation) (2008)
Étant Donnés, The French-American Fund for Performing Arts, (2006)
Florence Gould Foundation (2006)
Trust For Mutual Understanding (2006)
Greenwall Foundation (2004)
Arts International Grant (2004)
National Performance Network Creation Fund (2003)
DNA (Andrew W. Mellon foundation and Arts International) (2003)

== Big Art Group Productions ==
- Broke House (2022)
- Opacity (2017)
- Karlheinz Stockhausen's Originale (2014)
- Body Edit (2014)
- The People - L.E.S (2014)
- The People - Portland (2012)
- Broke House (2012)
- The People - San Francisco (2011)
- Flesh Tone (2010)
- Cityrama (2010)
- The Sleep' (2010)
- SOS (2008)
- The People - Halle (2008)
- The Imitation (2008)
- PainKiller (2008)
- The People (2007)
- Dead Set #2 & #3 (2006)
- House of No More (2004)
- Empty Island (2002)
- Flicker (2002)
- Self Life (2001)
- The Balladeer (2000)
- Clearcut Catastrophe (1999)

== Seminars, Colloquia, and teaching ==
Manson has taught and organized many various workshops in New York, Hamburg, Torino, Montreal, Polverigi, Toulouse, Istanbul, Portland and San Francisco. They have lectured at numerous colleges and universities including Reed College, Carnegie Mellon, the CUNY Graduate Center, the University of Buffalo, and Parsons. In addition to receiving invitations from leading festivals and presenters (Hebbel am Ufer Berlin, Festival d'Automne à Paris, La Vie de Festival Rome, Desingel Antwerp, Wexner Center for the Arts, REDCAT, Yerba Buena Center for the Arts, Warhol Museum and the Kitchen), Manson has spoken on international panels. Manson taught at Bern University of the Arts, Brooklyn College, and Carnegie Mellon. Formerly the head of the John Wells Masters in Fine Arts in Directing at Carnegie Mellon University, they are currently the Director of the Graduate and Undergraduate Theatre Program at Sarah Lawrence College.

== Commissions and residencies ==
2017
Richard B. Fisher Center for the Performing Arts for Opacity

2013
Abrons Art Center for The People - L.E.S

2012
Portland Center For Contemporary Art Time Base Art Festival for The People - Portland

2011
Yerba Buena Center For The Arts for The People - San Francisco

2009
Szene Salzburg, Austria for the production of The People - Salzburg

2008
Theatre der Welt, Germany for the production of The People - Halle
Hebbel am Ufer, Germany for the production of The Imitation

2007
Vienna Festwochen, Austria for the production of SOS
Inteatro Polverigi, Italy for the production of The People - Polverigi

2006
Festival d'Automne à Paris, France; Maison des Arts de Créteil, France; Hebbel Am Ufer, Germany; Frankfurt Mousonturm, Germany; he Wexner :Center for the Arts, US; The Kitchen, US for the production of Dead Set #2

2004
The Kitchen, USA; Festival d'Automne à Paris; Theatré Gâronne, France; Maison de la Culture de Créteil, France; Hebbel Am Ufer, Germany; Caserne :Mirabeau, France; Teatro di Roma - Vie dei Festival, Italy; The Wexner Center for the Arts, USA; Performance Space 122, USA; National Performance :Network, USA for the production of House of No More

== Writing ==
Manson has published writings with Jemma Nelson in Theatre Magazine (Vol 40, no. 2; Vol 42, no. 3), PAJ: A Journal of Performance and Art, and Theater der Zeit.
