= Cornelia Schröder-Auerbach =

German musician, musicologist and author (1900 - 1997)

- Born: August 24, 1900; Breslau, German Empire
- Died: October 11, 1997 (aged 97); Berlin
- Education: University of Freiburg
- Occupations: musicologist, musician, writer
- Years active: 1930 - 1995
- Spouse: Hanning Schröder
- Children: Nele Hertling

Cornelia Schröder-Auerbach (24 August 1900 – 11 October 1997) was a German musician, musicologist and writer. In 1928, she was the first woman in Germany to receive a doctorate in musicology. In 1930 she and her husband, composer Hanning Schröder, along with lute player Peter Harlan founded the Harlan Trio for historically informed performances, path-breaking for this new genre.

Baptized as a Protestant, she was considered Jewish in Nazi Germany because of her Jewish grandparents. With the Nazi takeover of the German government and its anti-Semitic discriminations, the non-observant Protestant Schröder-Auerbach was banned in 1934 from publicly performing, because her four grandparents had been Jewish. After World War II, she joined the East German Academy of Arts in East Berlin in 1952, where she rebuilt the music archive until her dismissal in 1959.

== Biography ==
Cornelia (Cora) Schröder-Auerbach was the daughter of the Breslau pianist Max Auerbach (born 1872) and the sister of Klaus, Günter and Johannes Ilmari Auerbach, as well as the niece of the Jena physicist Felix Auerbach. After her parents separated in 1906, her mother, the teacher Käthe Auerbach (1871–1940), moved to Jena with her two youngest sons, while Johannes and Cornelia initially stayed with their father. Her childless uncle, Felix Auerbach, a professor at the University of Jena, soon became the stepfather of all the children. Cora Auerbach grew up in her uncle's house in Jena, which was frequented by artists and patrons such as Clara Harnack, Reinhard Sorge, Eberhard Grisebach and Botho Graef. She played keyboard instruments, recorder and was a student of composer Max Reger.

In 1918/19 she worked as music teacher at the Wickersdorf Free School and had connections to the Wandervogel and other youth movements. From 1920 she studied musicology in Breslau, Munich, Jena and Freiburg with Wilibald Gurlitt. She received her Ph.D. in 1928 with a dissertation entitled "The German Clavichord Art of the 18th Century". She was the first female musicologist to receive a doctorate in Germany.

In 1929 she married the composer Hanning Schröder in Berlin. In 1930 she and Hanning Schröder, along with lute player Peter Harlan founded the Harlan Trio for historically informed performances, path-breaking for this new genre and based on her research in clavichord music and compositions. Because Hanning Schröder composed songs for workers' choirs and his wife did not deny her Jewish ancestry, Cornelia Schröder-Auerbach, like her husband, was banned from the Reich Chamber of Music in 1934. With the Nazi takeover and its anti-Semitic discriminations the non-observant Protestant Schröder-Auerbach was banned in 1934 from publicly performing, because all four of her grandparents were Jewish.

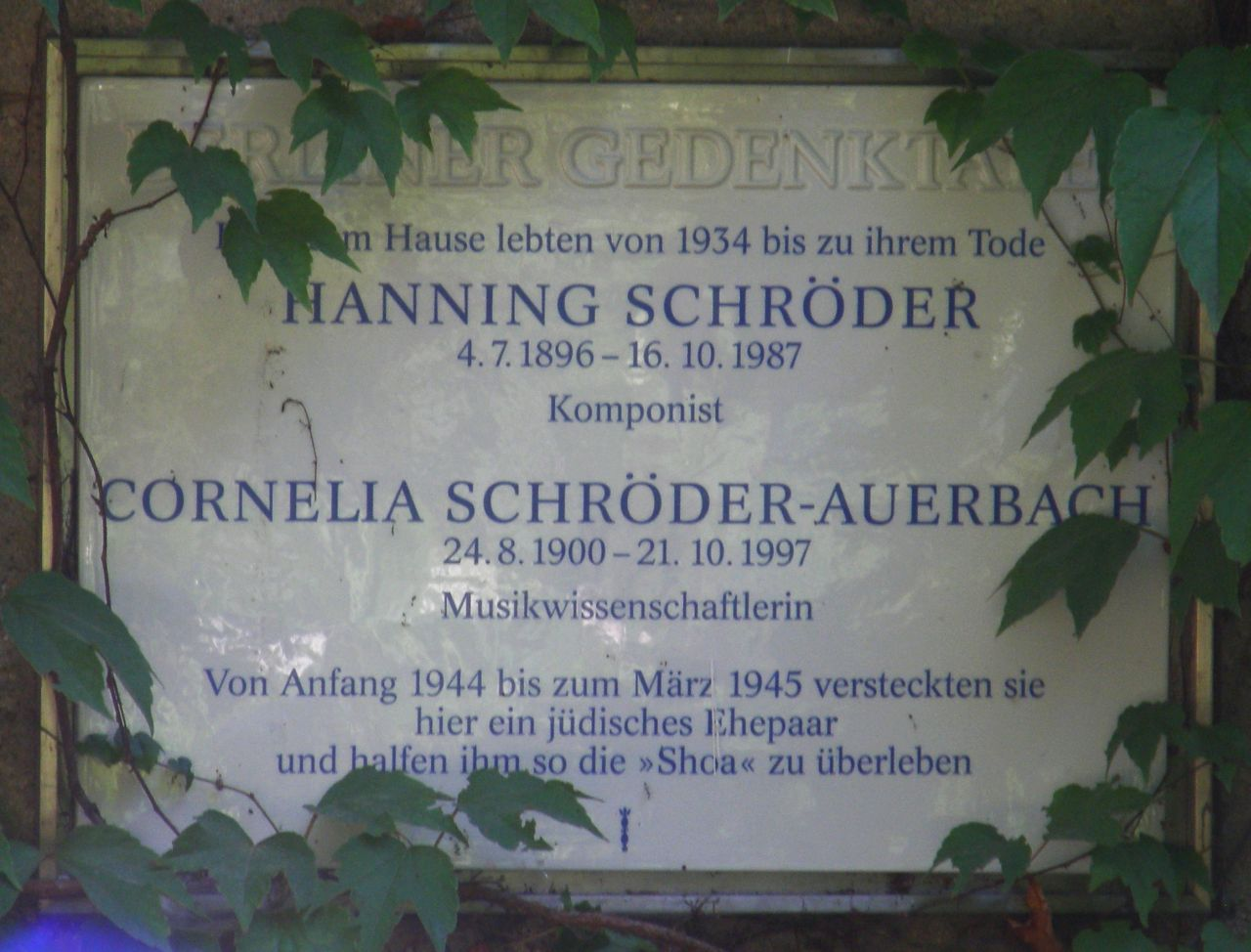
Memorial plaque for Hanning Schröder and Cornelia Schröder-Auerbach at Quermatenweg 148, Berlin-Zehlendorf

During the final year of World War II trying to seek refuge from the bombing of Berlin, Schröder-Auerbach moved with her daughter Nele to the village of Dargun, Mecklenburg. Under veiled so-called Aryan identity she restarted public music performances in the village of Dargun, working as church organist, choirmaster and music teacher. From the beginning of 1944 to March 1945, the Schröders hid the Jewish couple Werner and Ilse Rewald, who had gone into hiding, in their home in Berlin-Zehlendorf, saving them from certain death. In 1978, Hanning Schröder was recognized for this by Yad Vashem as Righteous Among the Nations.

After 1945 she worked as cantor at the Evangelical Lutheran Church of Mecklenburg. Further, she networked in the music chapter of the Mecklenburg state association of the Cultural Association of the GDR. In 1952 she joined the East German Academy of Arts in East Berlin, where she rebuilt the music archive, lost in 1945 with the destruction of the preceding Prussian Academy of Arts. On 1st January 1959, however, she was dismissed without notice. After this, she worked as a freelance music teacher, also publishing her musicological research. In 1996, German-American musicologist Nico Schüler edited a Festschrift for Cornelia Schröder-Auerbach and her husband. Schröder-Auerbach died on 21 October 1997 in Berlin.

== Selected works ==
- Die deutsche Clavichordkunst des 18. Jahrhunderts, Leipzig 1930, Kassel 1953, 1959
- D. G. Turk: Kleine Handstücke fur Klavier (1932)
- R. Schumann: Sämtliche Heine-Lieder (Leipzig 1956)
- J. P. Kellner: Ausgewählte Klavierstücke (Leipzig 1957)
- C. Fr. Zelter: Ausgewählte Mannerchöre (Leipzig 1958)
- Wir komponieren mit zwei Würfeln. Musikalisches Lehrspiel nach Mozart (Pößneck 1958)
- Carl Friedrich Zelter und die Akademie. Monographien und Biographien. Deutsche Akademie der Künste, Berlin 1959
- Frauen in der Geschichte der Sing-Akademie zu Berlin. Festschrift zum 175-jährigen Bestehen, Berlin 1966, pp. 97–105.
- Mond und Menschen; 9 Lieder aus „Chinesische Flöte“ von Hans Bethge für Sopran, Flöte und Klavier
- Kleine Klaviermusik für zwei große und zwei kleine Hände
- Musik für Viola solo
- Pflanzenkantate nach Gedichten v. Hans Much. Für Sopran, Flöte und Bratsche
- Cornelia Schröder-Auerbach & Maria Schmid: Johannes Ilmari Auerbach. Plastik – Malerei – Graphik. Städtische Museen Jena 1991
- Cornelia Schröder-Auerbach: Eine Jugend in Jena. In Jürgen John / Volker Wahl (eds.): Zwischen Konvention und Avantgarde. Doppelstadt Jena–Weimar. Böhlau, Weimar 1995, pp. 1–20 ISBN 978-3-412-08894-1.

== Literature ==
- Lilo Fürst-Ramdohr: Freundschaften in der Weißen Rose. Verlag Geschichtswerkstatt Neuhausen, München 1995, ISBN 3-931231-00-3.
- Nele Hertling: Cornelia Schröder-Auerbach in Lexikon verfolgter Musiker und Musikerinnen der NS-Zeit (LexM).
- Hugo Riemann, Wilibald Gurlitt, Hans Heinrich Eggebrecht, Carl Dahlhaus: Riemann Musik Lexikon: Personenteil L-Z, Ausgabe 12. B. Schott's Söhne, Mainz 1961.
- Nico Schüler: Hanning Schröder. Dokumente und kritisches Werkverzeichnis (= Verdrängte Musik, Bd. 15). von Bockel, Hamburg 1996, ISBN 3-928770-67-5.
- Nico Schüler (ed.): Zwischen Noten- und Gesellschaftssystemen: Festschrift für Cornelia Schröder-Auerbach zum 95. Geburtstag und zum Andenken an Hanning Schröder anlässlich seines 100. Geburtstages (= Greifswalder Beiträge zur Musikwissenschaft, Bd. 2). Lang, Frankfurt am Main 1996, ISBN 3-631-49832-2.
- Meike Werner: Moderne in der Provinz: kulturelle Experimente im Fin de Siècle Jena; Wallstein Verlag, Göttingen 2003. ISBN 3-89244-594-X.
