= Yen Han =

Yen Han may refer to:

- Yên Hân, a commune merged to form Yên Bình, Thái Nguyên, Vietnam
- Yen Han (dancer), ballet dancer with Ballett Zürich
