= Virve Sutinen =

Swedish dancer and theatre director

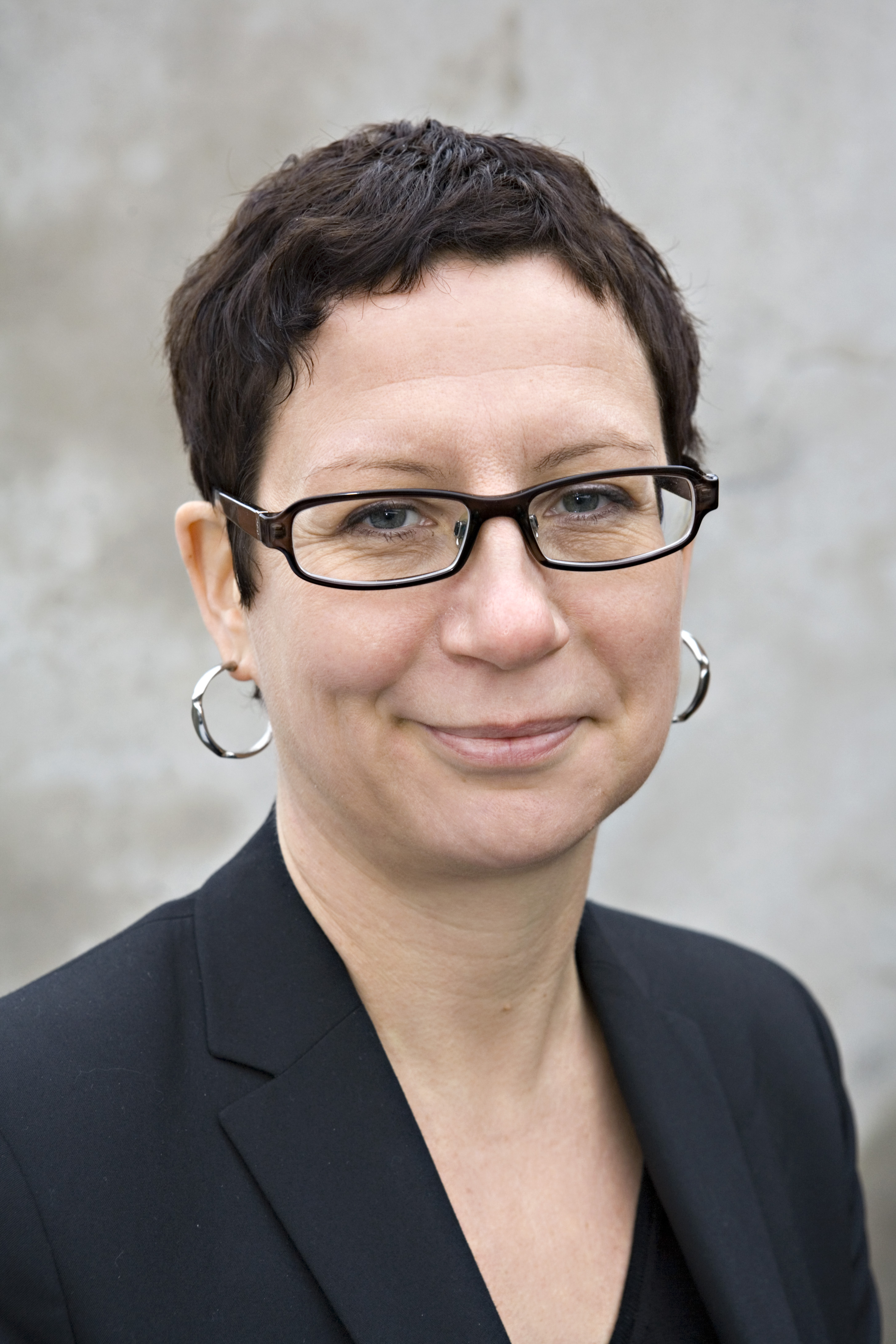
Virve Sutinen

Virve Katri Maria Sutinen (born 9 March 1962) was director of the Dansens hus in Stockholm between 1 January 2008 and 31 December 2013 and artistic director of Tanz im August Berlin since 2014.

== Biography ==
Sutinen studied comparative literature, theatre and sociology at the University of Helsinki. In 1994, she graduated at the New York University. She has worked in dance and other performing arts as a choreographer, theatre producer, artistic director, festival director and since 1998 as director of the guest performance venue Kiasma in Helsinki.

A serious knee injury put an end to her career as a dancer in the 1980s, and she turned to writing about dance as a reviewer. Sutinen is involved in several national and international networks where she has also held several positions of trust. She has been the director of the "International Network for Contemporary Performing Arts" and in 2007 was the chair and area representative of Kulturkontakt Nord's networking and mobility programme.

Her articles on contemporary performing arts have appeared in various journals and publications. In 2005 she was the editor of On the Theatresruins. Previously, she has worked at the Information Centre for Dance in Finland, was responsible for Tanssi Magazine and worked as a choreographer.

She was artistic director and general manager of the Dansens hus in Stockholm between 1 January 2008 and 31 December 2013. Since 2014, Sutinen is artistic director of the contemporary dance festival Tanz im August Berlin. The dance festival is produced by Hebbel am Ufer.
