= Bettina Masuch =

German theatrologist

Bettina Masuch (born 1964) is a German dramaturg and theatre director as well as artistic director at the Festspielhaus St. Pölten.

== Life and work ==
Born in Solingen, Masuch studied German language and literature, philosophy and applied theatre studies at the Justus Liebig University in Giessen. After engagements as a dramaturg at the Kaaitheater in Brussels and at the Theaterhaus Jena, she moved to the Berlin Volksbühne am Rosa-Luxemburg-Platz in 1998 and worked there as a dramaturg for productions by Frank Castorf, Christoph Schlingensief and René Pollesch. In 2002, she worked as a production dramaturge for the choreographer Meg Stuart at the Schauspielhaus Zürich. From 2003 to 2008, she worked as a dance curator for the Hebbel am Ufer theatre in Berlin. Until 2008, she was a member of the artistic direction of the dance festival Tanz im August in Berlin. From 2009 to 2013, Masuch directed the Springdance Festival in Utrecht.

Since the beginning of the 2014/15 season, Masuch has been the artistic director of the Tanzhaus NRW in Düsseldorf. Under her direction, the venue was awarded the Theaterpreis des Bundes in 2017. Furthermore, she is the editor and author of specialist publications and has teaching assignments at international universities.

In 2022, Masuch will take over as artistic director at the Festspielhaus St. Pölten, succeeding Brigitte Fürle in this function.

== Publications ==
- Bühnen / Räume. Damit die Zeit nicht stehenbleibt. (as editor), Theater der Zeit, Berlin 2000. ISBN 978-3-934344020.
- Wohnfront 201–2002. (as editor), Alexander-Verlag, Berlin 2002. ISBN 978-3-895810787.
