= Swiss Performing Arts Awards =

Swiss theatre, dance, and other performing arts awards

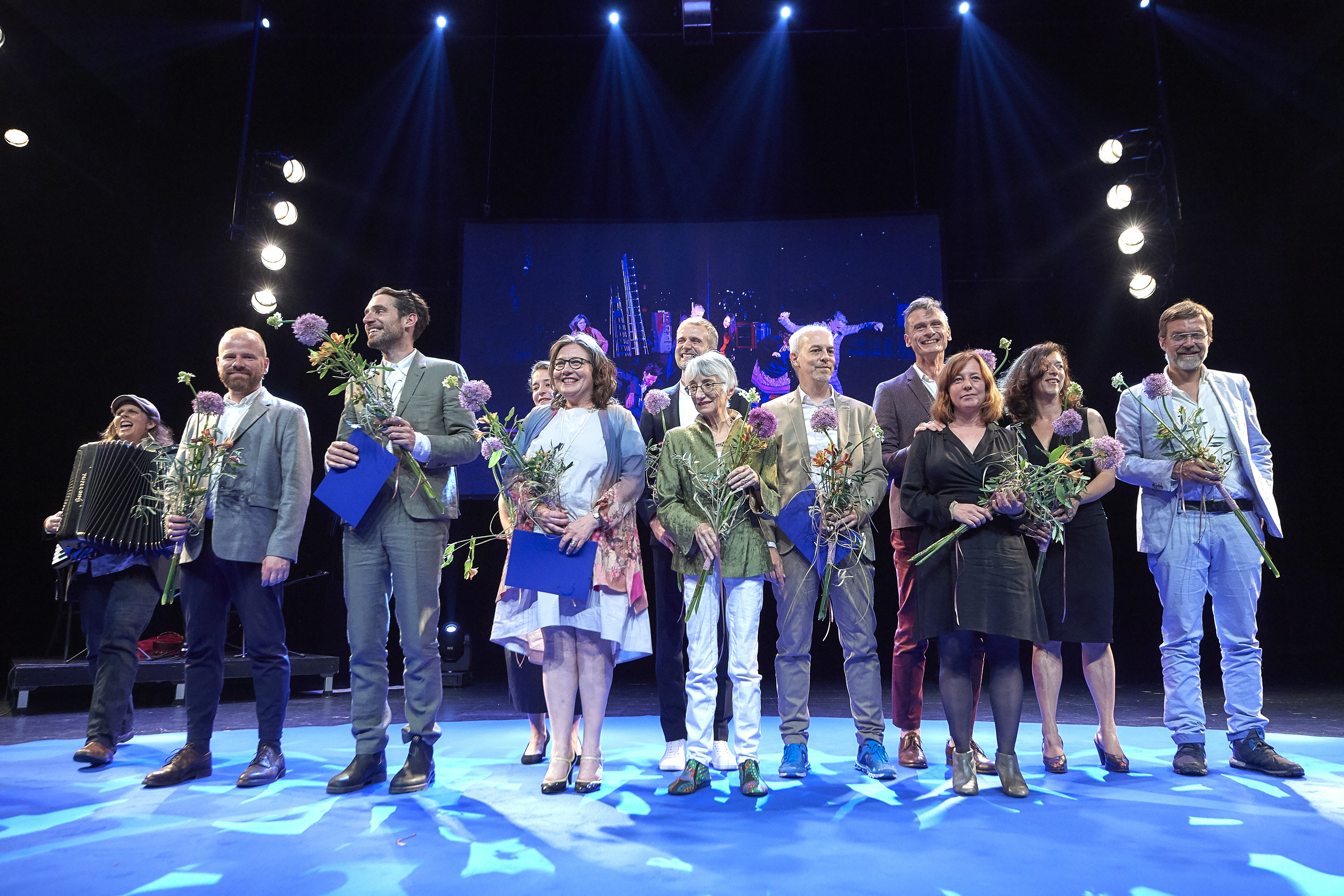
Swiss Theater Awards (2019)

The Swiss Performing Arts Awards, formerly the Swiss Theatre Awards (French: Journées du théâtre suisse; German: Schweizer Theaterpreis; Irish: Giornate del Teatro Svizzero) and Swiss Dance Awards, are a set of annual prizes awarded by the Federal Office of Culture (FOC), to personalities or groups of persons active in the Swiss theatre world.

== History ==
The first Swiss Theatre Awards were presented in 2014, and were presented annually by the FOC until 2020. The Swiss Dance Awards were presented biennially by the FOC from 2013 to 2019.

In 2021, two awards were merged as the Swiss Performing Arts Awards, are presented annually at a joint ceremony.

== Description ==
The Swiss Performing Arts Awards are awarded by the FOC, to personalities or groups of persons active in the Swiss performing arts world (formerly separately theatre and dance).

The laureates are chosen by the federal theatre jury, and none of the prizes are part of a competition.

== Prize categories ==
Swiss Grand Award for the Performing Arts / Hans Reinhart Ring is awarded in cooperation with the Swiss Association for Theatre Studies (SGTK).

There are nine other awards in dance, theatre, and the performing arts "to individuals or institutions that have rendered outstanding services to the diverse cultural output of the performing arts in Switzerland". In addition, there is a June Johnson Newcomer Prize awarded in collaboration with the Stanley Thomas Johnson Foundation to one dance and one theatre production of the previous year.

== Other Swiss awards ==
Other awards given by the FOC are the Swiss Art Awards, Swiss Design Awards, Swiss Literature Awards, Swiss Film Awards, and Swiss Music Prize.
