= Nele Hertling =

German theatre director (born 1934)

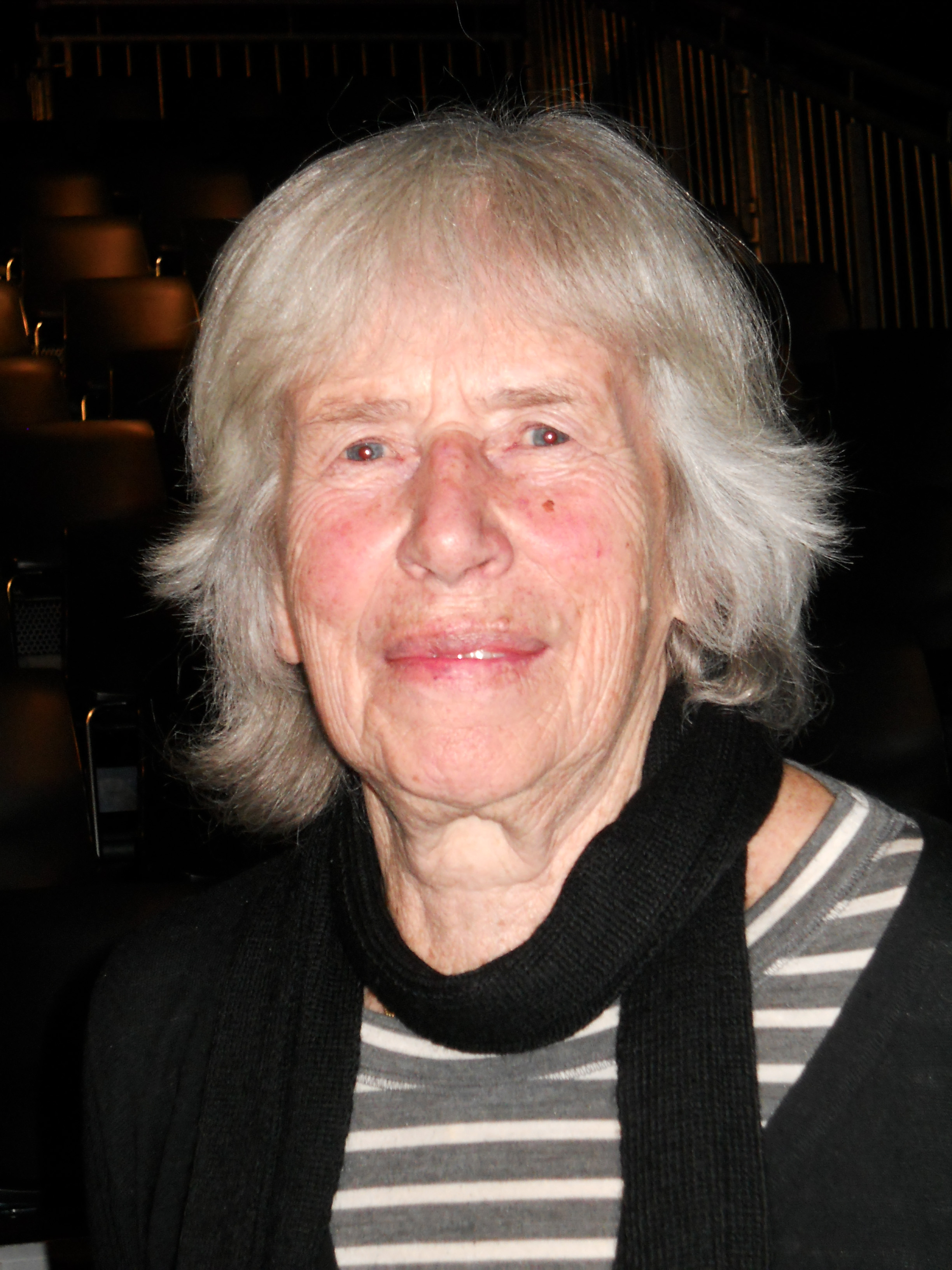
- Hertling in 2012
- Born: Nele Schröder; 23 February 1934 (age 91); Berlin, Germany
- Education: Humboldt University Berlin
- Occupations: Culture administrator; Theatre manager
- Organizations: Academy of Arts, Berlin; Hebbel Theatre; Goethe-Institut; Kulturstiftung des Bundes
- Spouse: Cornelius Hertling
- Awards: Ordre des Arts et des Lettres; Order of Merit of the Federal Republic of Germany; Legion of Honour

Nele Hertling (née Schröder; born 23 February 1934) is a German theatre manager and promoter of innovative culture. Working for the Academy of Arts, Berlin, from 1962, she has founded regular programs of innovative art in the city, such as Pantomime-Musik-Tanz-Theater in 1970 and the Tanz im August festival in 1988. She managed the program for Berlin as the European City of Culture that year. Hertling is considered the grande dame of the established German Freies Theater (free theatre).

== Life and work ==
Hertling was born in Berlin as daughter of composer Hanning Schröder and musicologist Cornelia Schröder-Auerbach. Growing up in a family of musicians, she was early exposed to the performing arts and contemporary culture. After studying German studies and theatre studies at the Faculty of Philosophy of Humboldt University Berlin, which she completed in 1957, she worked freelance for radio and theatre. She lived in London for one year with her husband, Cornelius Hertling. She worked for the Academy of Arts, Berlin, from 1962, as a research assistant in the departments of music and performing arts. There, she brought innovative art forms to Berlin.

From 1974, she also worked as a senate secretary. In 1987, she took over the management of the Werkstatt Berlin to develop the program for Berlin as the European City of Culture in 1988. From 1989 to 2003, she was artistic director of the Hebbel Theatre.

From the summer of 2003 until the end of 2006, Hertling was director of the DAAD Artists-in-Berlin Program. She is a member and collaborator in numerous bodies and networks, including the I.E.T.M. (Informal European Theatre Meeting), Theorem, Gulliver Clearing House in Amsterdam, since 1995 she has been a member of the "Franco-German Cultural Council" (President since 2001), the Goethe-Institut's Performing Arts Advisory Board and the Board of Trustees of the Kulturstiftung des Bundes. She is a co-founder of the initiative "A Soul for Europe" and a member of its strategy group. Since 2006 she has been vice-president of the Academy of Arts, Berlin.

== Work ==
Hertling initiated several programs of innovative culture. From 1970, she created programs and series of events in Berlin, including Pantomime-Musik-Tanz-Theater (PMTT), with Dirk Scheper, for pantomime, music, dance and theatre. From 1972, several art didactic programs were added. In 1988, she founded a festival Tanz im August, which was named Internationales Tanzfest Berlin – Tanz im August from 1999 to 2003. She was responsible, with Thomas Langhoff, for the conception and program of the Germany-wide festival Theater der Welt (theatre of the world).

== Awards and prizes ==
- 1978: Deutscher Kritikerpreis for dance, together with Dirk Scheper
- 1993: Knight of the Ordre des Arts et des Lettres
- 1995: Order of Merit of Berlin
- 1999: Order of Merit of the Federal Republic of Germany
- 2001: Knight of the Legion of Honour
- 2004: Caroline Neuber Prize of the city of Leipzig
- 2004: ITI-Preis zum Welttheatertag of the International Theatre Institute
- 2013: Officer's Cross of the Order of Merit of the Federal Republic of Germany
- 2014: Ernst-Reuter-Plakette
- 2014: Officer of the Ordre des Arts et des Lettres
- 2018: Deutscher Tanzpreis
- 2024: Der Faust – life's work
