= Hebbel-Theater =

Theatre building in Berlin

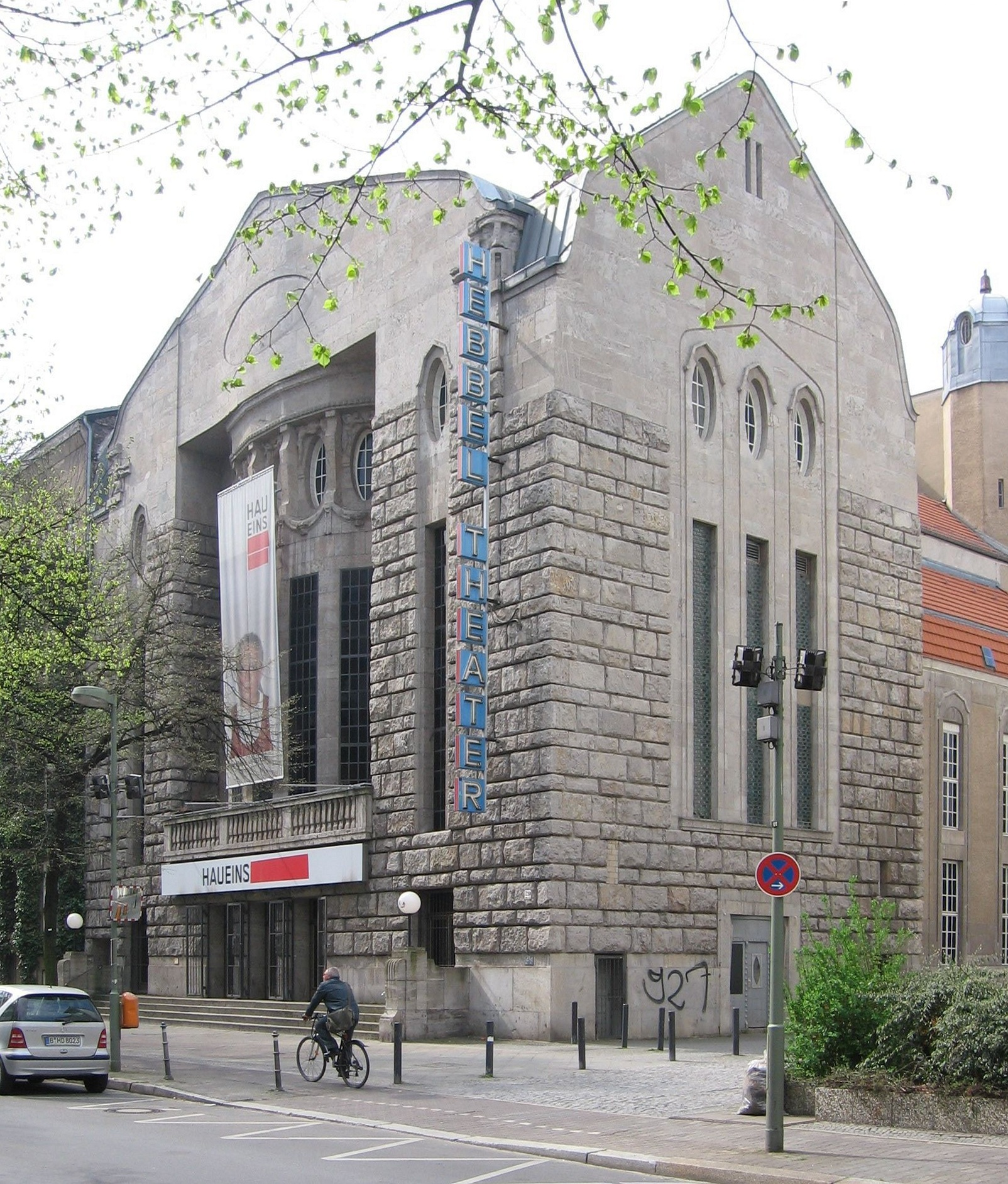
- Hebbel-Theater in 2017
- Formation: 1908
- Location: Berlin-Kreuzberg, Germany
- Coordinates: 52°30′00″N 13°23′14″E
- Leader: Annemie Vanackere
- Website: www.hebbel-am-ufer.de

The Hebbel-Theater (Hebbel Theatre) is a historic theatre building for plays in Berlin-Kreuzberg, Germany. It has been a venue of the company Hebbel am Ufer (HAU) from 2003.

The theatre, with approximately 800 seats, was built by Oskar Kaufmann in 1907/08 in Jugendstil. The corner building is integrated into the row of houses. It was an early and unique work by the theatre architect, and established his fame as a master theatre builder who then created five more theatres in Berlin. The Hebbel-Theater thrived in the 1920s. It was the only Berlin play theatre to survive World War II almost without damage. The Hebbel-Theater, the Schaubühne am Halleschen Ufer and the Theater am Ufer are all venues of HAU.

== History ==
=== History and construction period ===
In May 1906, the Hungarian theatre director Eugen Robert (aka Jenö Kovázs) planned the construction of a Schauspielhaus in Berlin with the intention of staging popular and modern acting there. He remembered having seen a bedroom's design at an exhibition in Wertheim the same year, by Oskar Kaufmann, who afterwards gained experience in theatre building with the Berlin architect Bernhard Sehring. Robert commissioned him to build a playhouse at Berlin's Café Central.

Kaufmann found the property in the southern Friedrichstadt, which the registered Building owners' association Theater in der Königgrätzer Straße acquired in October 1906 for 460,000 marks. The corner plot was located between Belle-Alliance-Platz and Askanischer Platz in what is now Stresemannstraße 61, in a middle-class residential area. The theatre was incorporated into the existing perimeter block development.

Kaufmann delivered the first designs for the theatre in August 1906. Construction was postponed due to the sudden death of the financier Herzfeld causing financial uncertainties. In addition, the Ministry of Public Works initially refused permission due to unsettled legal relations of the adjacent private road on which the theatre was to be built. After minor changes to the plans, the execution of the construction could finally begin in February 1907. In addition to Kaufmann, three other collaborators were involved in the design of the theatre, architects Albert Weber and San Micheli Wolkenstein, and the private lecturer and structural engineer Bruno Schulz.

=== The 1920s heyday ===
The theatre was opened on 29 January 1908 after a three-month construction period. It was named Hebbel-Theater, after the playwright Friedrich Hebbel who died in 1863. His Maria Magdalena was chosen to celebrate the opening. Robert, the founder and first director of the theatre, had to give up the management at the beginning of 1909 due to financial problems; and was criticised for numerous miscasts, unfavourable choices of plays and the lack of independent direction. After a short period of self-administration, the two directors Carl Meinhard and Rudolf Bernauer followed, and the theatre was renamed Theater in der Königgrätzer Straße on 30 September 1911. One of the stars was Maria Orska who appeared as Wedekind's Lulu in 1916, and as Wilde's Salome.

The Hebbel-Theatre had its heyday in the 1920s, when Paul Wegener, Tilla Durieux, Elisabeth Bergner and Fritzi Massary appeared in plays by Henrik Ibsen, August Strindberg, Frank Wedekind and later in works by William Shakespeare and Johann Wolfgang von Goethe. The repertoire was expanded to include comedies, social satires, political comedies and operetta-type performances, in keeping with prevailing audience preferences. Victor Barnowsky took over the management in 1925, and engaged stars such as Hans Albers, Fritz Kortner, Paul Hörbiger and Curt Bois. In 1927, Hans Kaltneker's mystery The Sister was performed, with Orska as Ruth. He also engaged director Erwin Piscator.

During the Nazi era, the theatre was gleichgeschaltet in 1934, under the general directorship of Eugen Klöpfer from the Volksbühne, who completely renewed the equipment and reduced the hall to 672 seats. The house was largely spared destruction in the Second World War, apart from a bomb that hit it in the 1943/44 season, damaging the foyer and the roof of the stage. By the end of July 1945, the theatre was operational again.

=== Post-war period and restoration work ===
In 1945, the Hebbel-Theater was the only working theatre building in Berlin. For the reopening on 15 August 1945, the Dreigroschenoper by Brecht and Weill was performed, with Hubert von Meyerinck as Mackie. Restoration work on the house was led by Karl-Friedrich Demmer in 1946/47. He had the oak entrance doors replaced with plain wooden portals, covered the roof of the front of the building with tiles and made many changes in the design of the interior. The theatre, in the American Sector, was renamed Hebbel Theatre, and was soon considered the most important stage in West Berlin. Due to its unique position in the destroyed city, it was always a sold-out venue for modern US and Western playwrights. Admission could be bought by offering coal for heating. The artistic director until 1948 was Karlheinz Martin. In line with the denazification, his repertoire favoured works by playwrights who had been defamed between 1933 and 1945. With the reopening of the larger Schiller Theater in 1951, the Hebbel Theatre lost importance. On 1 September 1952, Klaus Kinski performed there in the world premiere of the ballet (or mimodram) The Idiot, based on Dostoyevsky's The Idiot, with music by Hans Werner Henze and choreography by Tatjana Gsovsky.

=== 1960 until present ===
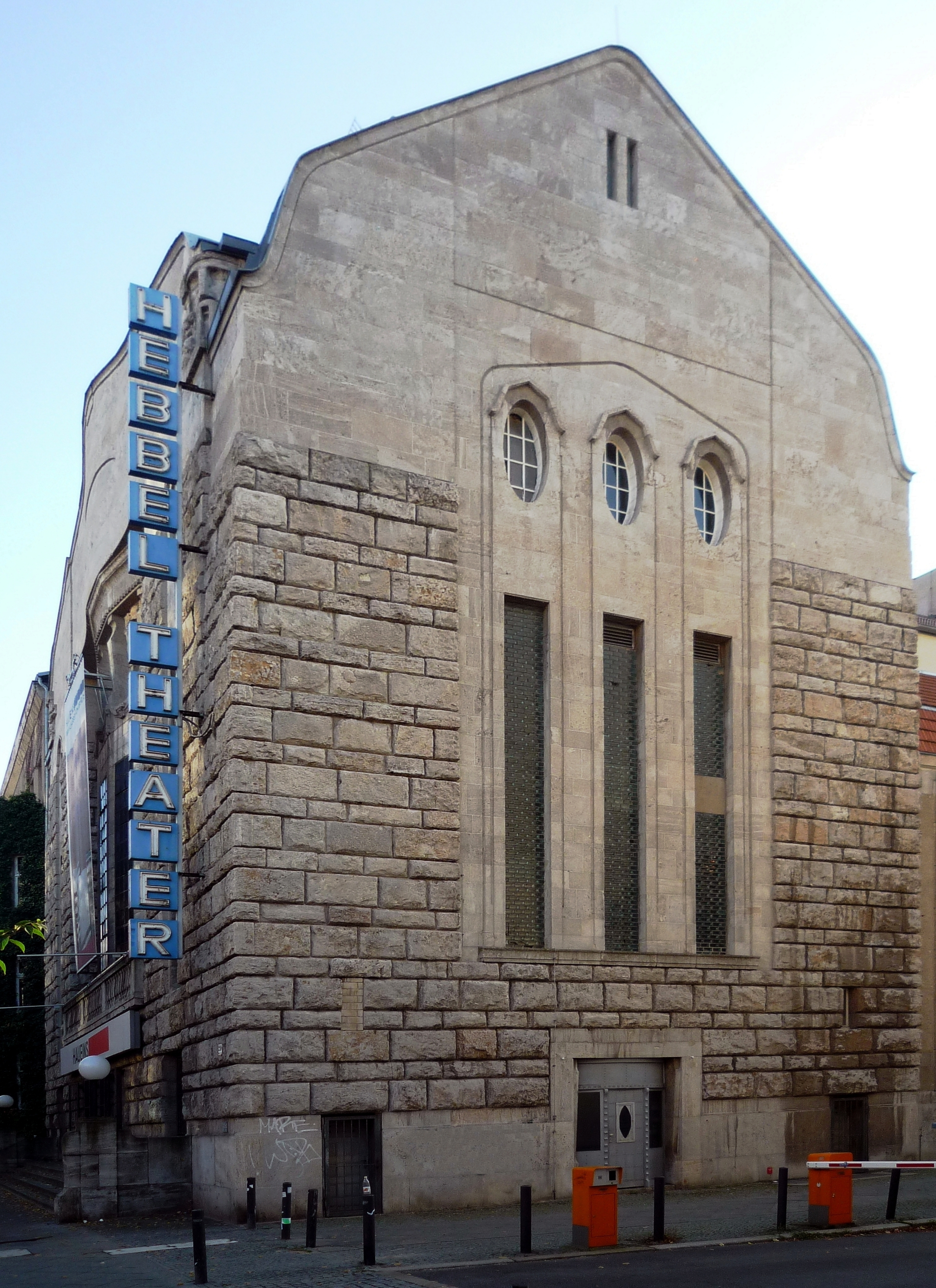
West facade

After the Hebbel-Theater was transferred to a private company in 1952, it became popular again in the 1960s as a Volkstheater. Rudolf Külüs was the director, and engaged popular stars such as Hans Epskamp, Harald Juhnke, Inge Meysel, Klaus Schwarzkopf and Rudolf Platte. The theatre was modernised in 1960 by the architect Sigrid Kressmann. She preferred pastel colours, made the house appear brighter by wide glass doors, and covered the walls with roughcast. She also installed advertising lettering above the entrance portals that could be seen from afar, and renovated the lighting in the interior. After Külüs' death, his wife Hela Gerber took over the management, but was unsuccessful. After years of financial difficulties, the Hebbel Theatre era ended with bankruptcy in 1978. Afterwards, the theatre was used as an alternative venue by other theatres including the Schaubühne am Halleschen Ufer, and as a guest venue. In 1984, the revival of Carl Graun's opera Montezuma took place there. The theatre was saved from being demolished by being a listed monument under Denkmalschutz. Since 1972, the theatre has been owned by the City of Berlin. A restoration completed in 1987 returned the house to Kaufmann's design. Financed by the Senate of Berlin, it aimed at making the venue available for the 750th anniversary of the city. It conveniently served also a year later when Berlin was European Capital of Culture.

In 1989, Nele Hertling took over as managing director and artistic director of the house. Through her efforts, the theatre became an internationally respected stage for contemporary theatre. She had to rely exclusively on guest performance groups, as the theatre did not have its own ensemble. In 2003, the Hebbel Theatre merged with the Schaubühne am Halleschen Ufer and the Theater am Ufer in the 2003/04 season to form Hebbel am Ufer (HAU). The artistic director was Matthias Lilienthal until July 2012, when he was succeeded by the Belgian Annemie Vanackere.

== Architecture ==
Due to the narrow plot, Oskar Kaufmann decided to erect a Logentheater with two facades, a main facade on Stresemannstraße and a secondary facade on the adjacent private street. This form of building a theatre with tiers strictly separates the auditorium from the stage and at the same time offers the possibility to integrate numerous seats.

The structure of the theatre serves optimal use of space and a clear disposition, divided into a front building with anterooms (entrances, cloakrooms, staircases and foyers), the audience and stage house and the administrative wing. On the secondary facade, this grouping of front and rear buildings is visible. Both facades are covered by a bossage almost up to the gable, with a sculptural effect by the block bond of alternately wide and narrow stone courses. The representative main facade of shell limestone is preceded by a perron leading to the three entrances set into the wall. The facade is crowned by a polygonal bay bordered by a balustrade and terminated by a gable with a copper roof. This niche-like construction is articulated by elongated window tracks and oculi. The latter are framed by relief figures. The subdivision by windows is repeated on the staircases to the left and right of the bay and on the front of the secondary facade. The rounded gable of the front facade is decorated on the sides with mask reliefs by Hermann Feuerhahn. The design of the main facade is a novel form, and was copied by other architects, such as Fritz Schumacher for the Dresden Crematorium. Kaufmann's exterior architecture is striking in its absence of superfluous building elements. The construction and decoration of the building are largely limited to necessities and serve above all the actual purpose of the building: the theatre performances. The rear buildings are hardly noticeable due to their simple, functional design and plastering. In front of the towering stage house are the two stair towers, which are covered by simple domed roofs. The facades of the three rear buildings appear withdrawn due to the uniform vertical arrangement of the windows and the simple plastering without decorative elements.

=== Interior design and furnishings ===
The front building of the Hebbel-Theater houses the entrances and vestibules to the auditorium. An oak-lined entrance hall, where the box-office counters are located, leads to cloakrooms and walkways panelled with rosewood. From there, side staircases lead to the main foyer and the tiers. The second tier is reached from the outside via two staircases. The two-storey main foyer, the theatre's representative room, is built in an oval-elliptical shape and panelled with reddish-brown mahogany and black pear wood. In the upper finish there are inlays of rosewood and mother-of-pearl.

Kaufmann attached great importance to the interior decoration of all rooms. Even the administration and dressing rooms were especially furnished and carefully decorated by him.

==== Auditorium ====
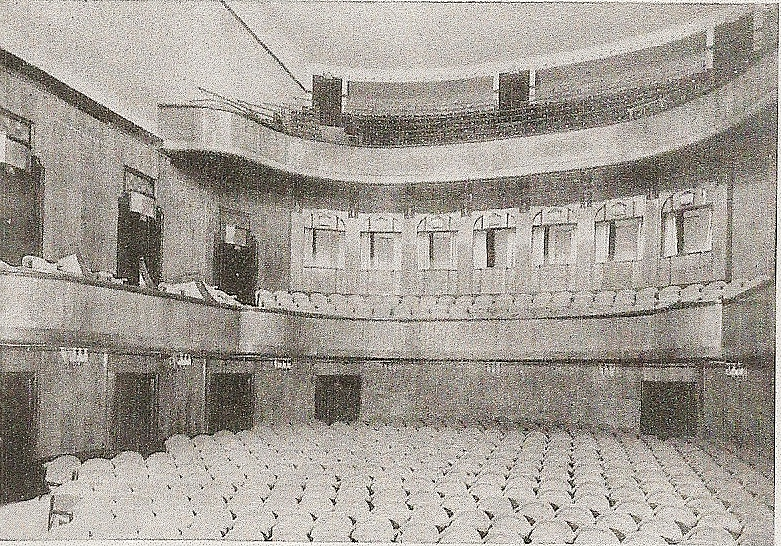
View into the auditorium in 1908

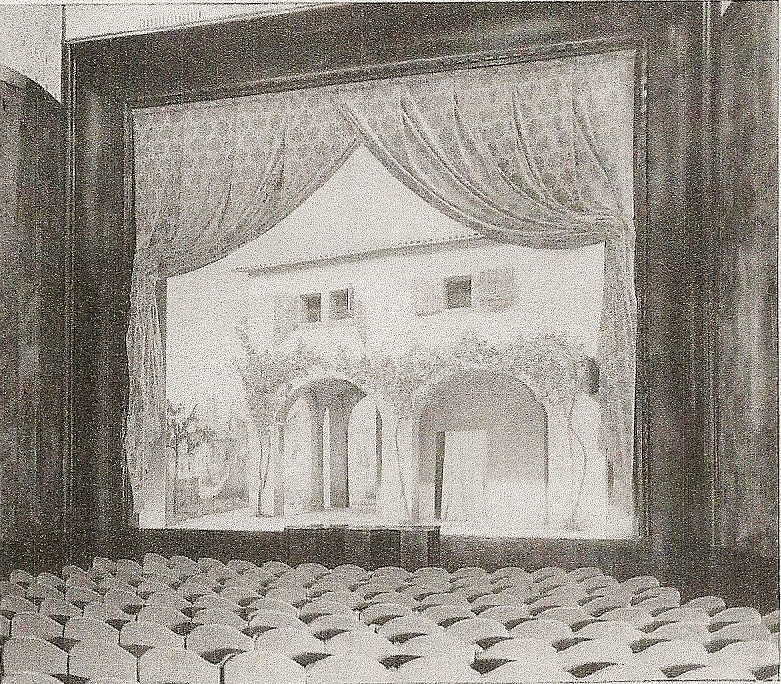
Stage in 1908

The auditorium is in a reduced two-aisle layout. Here, the second tier is not completely brought forward to the stage space in order to provide all spectators with the best viewing conditions and to prevent a distorted view of the stage. The tail shape of the balustrade is characteristic of Kaufmann's architecture and was also used as a single-aisle system in the Berlin Renaissance Theatre and the Kaliningrad Regional Drama Theatre in Königsberg. The two cylindrical towers on either side of the stage, each housing stairs, match the curved tiers. The 800-seat auditorium is almost entirely covered with reddish to golden-brown stained panels of birch wood and was originally additionally decorated with valuable silk fabrics. The monotony of a usual rank theatre is avoided by rounding off the ramps. The wooden panelling, which was made by the company E. E. Lehmann, extends up to the second tier and also includes the two towers. This cladding creates the uniform impression of the room, which is deliberately not broken up by the installation of rear boxes behind the first tier and thus represents Kaufmann's decisive innovation in comparison with other theatre constructions of the time. The ceiling is unadorned and without the "obligatory" chandelier.

==== Stage space ====
Oskar Kaufmann aimed for a strict separation of stage and auditorium by designing the stage frame similar to a picture frame. This funnel-shaped proscenium promotes the impression of a peep-box stage and was to become a characteristic feature of Kaufmann's architecture. With the almost square format of 12 m height as well as width of the opening, the play on stage appears as a framed picture, thus completely spatially separating the dramatic action from the audience hall. The spacious stage house (19 × 16 × 14 m) included a novel revolving stage with a diameter of 12.3 metres. Kaufmann's concept also included musical and opera performances. The first rows of stalls in the auditorium could be removed and the cavity beneath them used as an orchestra pit.

== Documentation ==
- Neugier & Risiko. Das Berliner Hebbel-Theater und seine europäischen Partner. documentation, Germany 1997, 60 Min., dir.: Christoph Rüter.
