= María La Ribot =

Spanish-Swiss dancer, choreographer and visual artist

La Ribot
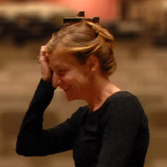
- Born: María José Ribot; 19 July 1962 (age 63); Madrid, Spain
- Occupations: Dancer, choreographer, visual artist
- Website: laribot.com

María José Ribot (born 19 July 1962), known as La Ribot, is a dancer, choreographer and visual artist. Her projects are based on movement, the body and her own experiences in dance, but she also uses other practices, systems and materials that her concepts generate. She is the main interpreter of her works while she also often creates the costumes, objects and scenery. With more than 45 works under her belt, including choreographies, installations and videos, La Ribot continues to find interest in living art, in the human body and its capacity for poetic, subversive and political expression. She has received the 2000 National Dance Award and the Gold Medal for Merit in Fine Arts 2016 – both granted by the Ministry of Culture of Spain – and the Culture Award of the Community of Madrid in Visual Arts 2018. In September 2019, she received the Swiss Grand Award for Dance granted by the Swiss Confederation in recognition of her artistic work.

== Madrid (1962–1997) ==
Between 1975 and 1984 she studied classical ballet, modern and contemporary dance, first in her hometown and later in Cannes (Rosella Hightower school), in Cologne (during summers at the Summer Akademie) and in New York (Movement research and Klein Technique). Back in Madrid, she continued her training with Víctor Ullate, Carmen Roche and other great masters of classical dance such as Luis Fuentes. In this city, she established herself as a choreographer in 1984 and, a year later, she created Carita de Angel, a first short work with a trio of women based on a musical collage of her authorship, from the famous homonymous song by Bonet de San Pedro from the 40s. In 1986 she founded and directed Bocanada Danza with the dancer and choreographer Blanca Calvo, a company that aimed to experience with choral choreographies and diverse narratives alongside original music. The group dissolved in 1989, but the work of all of them, today recognized artists, left a mark in the Spanish 80s scene. In 1991, she began to work under the name of La Ribot and premiered Socorro! Gloria!, a striptease of subtle humor. With this solo she reached new audiences and it became the inspiration for the 13 distinguished pieces, the first series of solos, that lasted from thirty seconds to seven minutes and that would be the germ of her distinguished pieces project. This was the generic title with which La Ribot named a series of pieces with a choreographic format based on brevity, accumulation and continuity.

With 13 distinguished Pieces, La Ribot re-positions contemporary dance in the field of contemporary art. These pieces were sold as an ephemeral art object to "Distinguished proprietors", who bought a single moment, the one in which the life of his distinguished piece took place: the performance. The name of the owner would always be next to the title of the piece and La Ribot promised to keep him/her informed of the life of the piece and invite them to see it. Also, at that time, she signed two duos for her and the actor Juan Loriente, Los trancos del avestruz and Oh! Sole!, while collaborating in the foundation of the UVI-La Inesperada, a dance research group, along with five other choreographers: Mónica Valenciano, Olga Mesa, Blanca Calvo, Ana Buitrago and Elena Córdoba.

== London (1997–2004) ==
In 1997, La Ribot moved to London, where years before she had presented Socorro! Gloria! and 13 distinguished pieces at the ICA (Institute of Contemporary Arts). From London, she starts a political project in Madrid: Deviations, a “deviated” contemporary dance festival, organized with her colleague Blanca Calvo, UVI-La Inesperada and José A. Sánchez. Also in London, she continued to work on other projects such as El Gran Game (1999). The second series of distinguished pieces, Más Distinguidas (1997), would be released in the first edition of Deviations. The third series of the distinguished pieces, Still Distinguished (2000) was co-produced and presented at the Théâtre de la Ville in Paris. Since then, La Ribot has maintained a close professional relationship with Paris, working with the Festival d'Automne, the Centre Pompidou and the Centre National de la Danse. At the beginning of the 2000s, she joined the Soledad Lorenzo´s Gallery in Madrid, with which she developed several large-scale projects: the video-installation Despliegue (2001) and Laughing Hole (2006), a durational, political and radical performance-installation, carried out for Art Unlimited – Art Basel 2006. In 2003, Live Culture presented Panoramix for the first time at the Tate Modern in London; an anthological version of the thirty-four distinguished pieces created until that moment. Successively, Panoramix is presented at the Centre Pompidou in Paris, at the Palacio de Velázquez-Museo Reina Sofía in Madrid, Le Quartz de Brest and the Centre d'Art Contemporain de Genève.

La Ribot had experimented already with video and the scene in El triste que nunca os vido (1991), but it is in 2000 that she began to record camera in hand, with sequence shots, developing the concept of corps-opérateur (operating body). These approaches have influenced many of her later works, such as the video-installation Despliegue (2001), Another pa amb tomàquet (2002), Traveling Olga / Traveling Gilles (2003) or Beware of Imitations! (2014), works that pose complex conceptual and technical challenges, such as the intense 25 minutes of Mariachi 17 film, with music composed by AtomTm, and that was part of the scenic piece Llámame Mariachi (2009). La Ribot contributed to Move: Choreographing You, creating the participatory installation Walk the Chair (2010). This first great installation with her fetish object, the wooden chair, foldable and popular, involved once again the viewer, with his body in motion and, as in Laughing Hole, the graphic inscription. Walk the Chair originated two more installations: Walk the Bastards (2017) and Walk the Authors (2018).

== Geneva (2004–present) ==
In 2004, La Ribot moved to Geneva, Switzerland, with her then partner, Swiss choreographer Gilles Jobin. In this city, she contributes to the founding of Art / Action, department of teaching and research on live arts at HEAD, Haute Ecole d'Art et Design, which she co-directed until 2008. During this period she also developed the large-scale scenic project 40 Espontáneos. In 2007, she made the film Treintaycuatropiècesdistinguées & onestriptease from her own video files. That same year, she conceived with the dancer and choreographer Mathilde Monnier, Gustavia, a burlesque duo that will tour the following years throughout the world. In 2011, she premiered the fourth series of Distinguished Pieces, PARAdistinguidas, a choral work conceived for five dancers, herself and twenty extras, with which she completes and continues her research on the figure of the extra, the figurant or the marginalized of the entertainment society. In 2012 she signed EEEXEEECUUUUTIOOOOONS !!!!, a choreography for 20 dancers, commissioned by the Ballet de Lorraine de Nancy (France). Also in 2012, the Museo Universitario de Arte Contemporáneo de México (MUAC), opened its exhibition space dedicated to live arts with a monographic exhibition on La Ribot. Another Distinguée (2016), the fifth series of distinguished pieces, is a trio for her, Juan Loriente and Thami Manekehla, in which the presence of a large installation in the center of the space forces the public to wander in the dark, one centimeter away from the interpreters.

The Tanz im August Festival in Berlin dedicated to La Ribot her first retrospective in 2017. That same year, she began working as an artist at the Max Estrella Gallery in Madrid (after the closing of the Soledad Lorenzo Gallery). In December 2017, they inaugurated their first exhibition together with Walk the Bastards, among other works. That same year, Henrique Amoedo, director of the inclusive dance company Dançando com a Diferença of Madeira (Portugal), invited La Ribot to create a choreography with his company. As a result of this collaboration Happy Island was created in 2018. The Cultural Center of Spain in Mexico, dedicated a monographic exhibition entitled Take a Seat in the summer of 2018, in which Walk the Authors premiered with great success. In 2019, two major projects are organized around the work of La Ribot: the Constellation presented by the Mercat de les Flors-Macba in Barcelona, and the Portrait dedicated to her work by the Festival d'Automne de Paris, becoming one of the few international artists who have occupied a place of that relevance in the prestigious festival. Both projects bring together several shows, including Panoramix, as well as various exhibitions of videos, installations and her notebooks since 1985. From January to September 2019, she participates in the collective exhibition El giro notacional in the MUSAC (León). Her visual work is part of the collections of ARTIUM (Vitoria), FRAC (Lorraine), MUSAC (León), La Panera (Lleida), Cajasol Foundation (Sevilla) and La Casa Encendida and Museo Nacional Centro de Arte Reina Sofía (Madrid).

In 2020, La Biennale Danza (Venice) awarded her the Golden Lion for her career.

== Awards and recognitions ==
- 1998 Nominated for a Paul Hamlyn Foundation Award
- 2000 National Dance Award of Spain
- 2015 Gold Medal of Merit in the Fine Arts of Spain
- 2018 Community of Madrid Culture Award in Plastic Arts
- 2019 Swiss Grand Award for Dance
- 2020 Biennale di Venezia Golden Lion for lifetime achievement

== Live works ==
- 1985: Carita de ángel
- 1986: Bocanada, in collaboration with Blanca Calvo
- 1988: Ahí va Viviana, in collaboration with Blanca Calvo
- 1990: Socorro! Gloria! (Striptease)
- 1991: 12 toneladas de plumas
- 1993: El triste que nunca os vido
- 1993: Los trancos del avestruz, duo with Juan Loriente
- 1993: 13 Piezas distinguidas, first series of the Pièces distinguées
- 1995: Oh! Sole!, duo with Juan Loriente
- 1997: Dip Me in the Water, in collaboration with Gilles Jobin
- 1997: Más distinguidas, second series of the Pièces distinguées
- 1998: Pressed Daily
- 1999: El gran game
- 2000: Still Distinguished, third series of the Pièces distinguées
- 2002: Anna y las más distinguidas, performed by Anna Williams
- 2003: Panoramix, anthological show that gathers the 34 Pièces distinguées of the three first series
- 2004: 40 Espontáneos
- 2006: Laughing Hole
- 2008: Gustavia, duo created and performed with Mathilde Monnier
- 2009: Llámame Mariachi
- 2011: PARAdistinguidas fourth series of the Pièces distinguées
- 2012: Eeexeeexuuuutiooooons!!! for the Ballet de Lorraine
- 2014: El Triunfo de la Libertad, co-creation with Juan Domínguez and Juan Loriente
- 2016: Another Distinguée fifth series of the Pièces distinguées
- 2016: Distinguished Hits (1991–2000) compilation of the Pièces distinguées and the solo Socorro! Gloria!
- 2016: Pièce distinguée Nº 45.
- 2017: Retrospective in Tamz in August in Berlin
- 2018: Happy Island
- 2019: Constelacion in the Mercat de les Flors of Barcelona
- 2019: Portrait in the Festival d'Automne de Paris
- 2019: Please Please Please, co-creation with Mathilde Monnier and Tiago Rodrigues

== Installations and video works ==
- 2000: Purely Organic
- 2001: Juanita Pelotari
- 2001: Despliegue
- 2002: Another Pa amb tomàquet
- 2003: Traveling Olga / Traveling Gilles
- 2008: Cuarto de Oro with Cristina Hoyos
- 2009: Mariachi 17
- 2010: Walk the Chair
- 2014: Beware of Imitations!
- 2014–2017: Film noir
- 2016: Huan Lan Hong
- 2017: Walk the Bastards
- 2018: Walk the Authors
