= Hanning Schröder =

German violist and composer

- Born: Hans Schröder; 4 July 1896; Rostock, Grand Duchy of Mecklenburg-Schwerin, German Empire
- Died: 16 October 1987 (aged 91); West Berlin, Germany
- Education: University of Rostock; University of Freiburg
- Occupations: Violist; Composer
- Organizations: Harlan Trio
- Awards: Righteous Among the Nations

Hanning Schröder (born Hans Schröder; 4 July 1896 – 16 October 1987) was a German composer and violist. From 1927, he worked in Berlin as a violist in orchestras for opera, radio and film, and in the Havemann String Quartet of his teacher Gustav Havemann. He formed the Harlan Trio with his wife and violinist Peter Harlan, performing Renaissance and Baroque music as pioneers of historical instruments. Due to his wife's Jewish descent, he had to stop working under the Nazi regime from 1935. They hid a Jewish couple in the house in Berlin that they left for safety reasons, earning them a Righteous Among the Nations recognition. As a composer, Schröder is known for chamber music, especially a string quartet based on the song of the Moorsoldaten from the Börgermoor concentration camp.

== Biography ==
Hans Schröder was born in Rostock, the son of a captain. He grew up in a music-loving family, learning to play the violin at a young age. He became leader of the family's "Schröder House Orchestra" at the age of 15, leading public concerts. After Notabitur, Schröder served as a soldier in World War I. At the Western Front, he was hit by shrapnel, which got stuck in a bundle of letters.

During the Weimar Republic era, Schröder first studied medicine in his hometown. He moved to study at the University of Freiburg in 1920, where he first began music studies, studying composition with Julius Weismann and musicology with Wilibald Gurlitt. He moved to Munich for one semester where he met his future wife, Cornelia Auerbach, who studied musicology. They continued their studies at the University of Jena, but when he failed his medical exam due to illness, he switched to music, and both returned to Freiburg. He also studied violin with Gustav Havemann, later specialising on viola, with a focus on chamber music. At the Donaueschingen Festival, he met like-minded people and received support. In 1924/25 he was the principal violinist in the chamber orchestra of the Schauspiel Düsseldorf. From 1927, he worked in Berlin for opera, radio and film, and in the Havemann String Quartet.

In 1929 Schröder married Cornelia Auerbach, who was the younger sister of Johannes Ilmari Auerbach. At the beginning of the 1930s, Schröder, his wife and the instrumentalist Peter Harlan performed, as the Harlan Trio, Renaissance and Baroque music on historical instruments all over Germany.

In Berlin, Schöder was recognised also as a composer, writing mostly pieces for children and amateurs. Under the Nazi regime, Schröder, along with Paul Dessau, Hanns Eisler, and others who had composed for the Großer Arbeiterchor Berlin, was expelled from the Reich Chamber of Music in 1935, also because his wife was of Jewish descent. He and his wife were given a Berufsverbot, however, because of his talent, he was still allowed to perform with a special permit as a violinist in the Theater am Nollendorfplatz in Berlin.

From 1944, Schröder's wife and their daughter Nele lived with the Rienau family in the Dargun parish of Mecklenburg, where she was an organist and a choir director from 1944 to 1952. From early 1944 to March 1945, they hid a Jewish couple, Werner and Ilse Rewald, in their Berlin house at Quermatenweg 148 in Steglitz-Zehlendorf, saving them from certain death.

After World War II, Schröder played in the DEFA orchestra, and headed the chamber music section of the East Berlin Composers' Association. After the construction of the Wall in 1961, his activities were limited to West Berlin, where he worked as a freelance composer. He dealt with the stylistic devices of counterpoint and twelve-tone technique in an undogmatic manner, and became a mentor of the Gruppe Neue Musik Berlin. His music became more and more reduced in ornamentation, more concise and economical. Significantly, the last works are monologues for cello, organ, clarinet, and oboe.

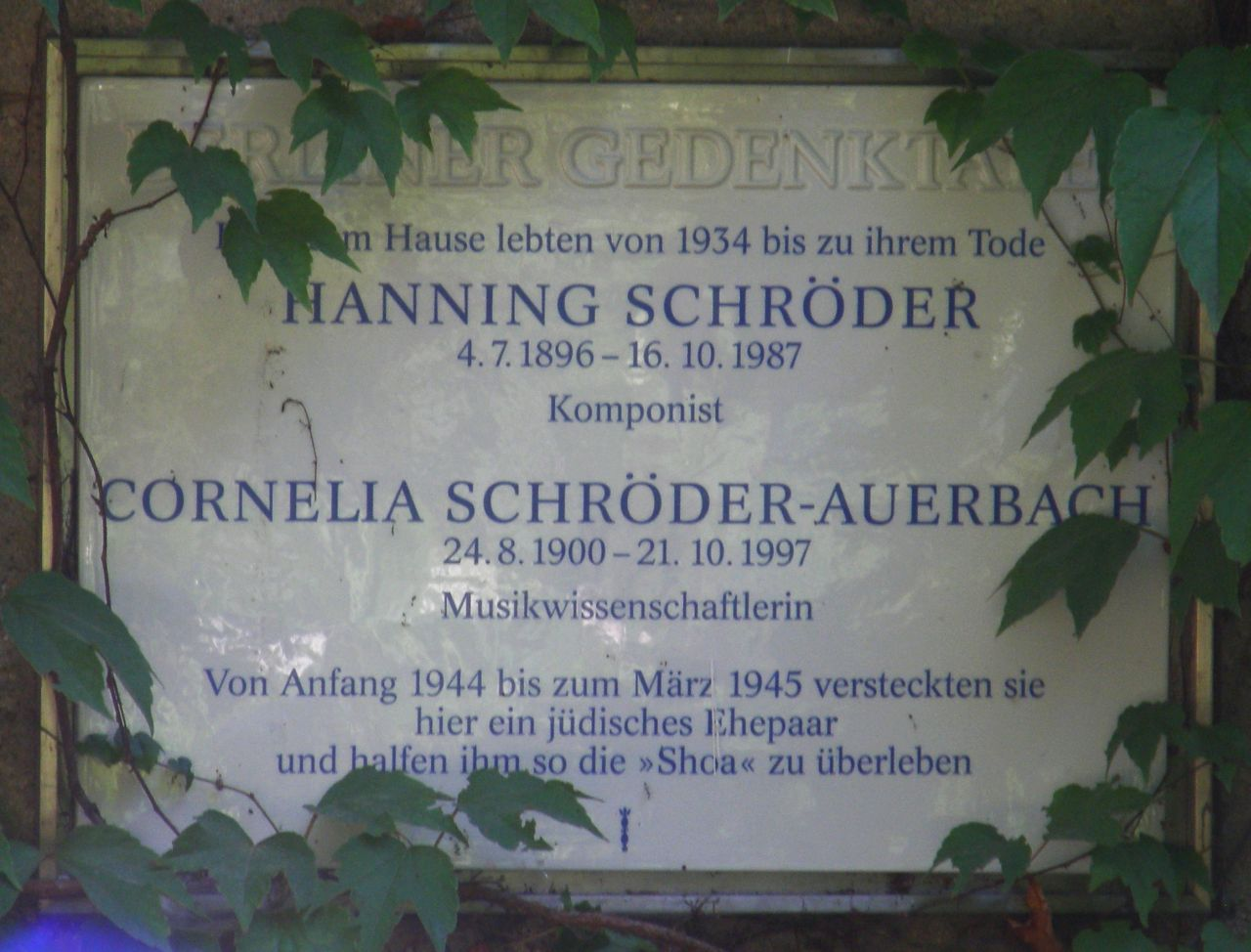
Commemorative plaque for Hanning and Cornelia Schröder-Auerbach at Quermatenweg 148, Berlin-Zehlendorf

Schröder died on 16 October 1987 in Berlin at age 91. Yad Vashem recognized Hanning Schröder as being Righteous Among the Nations in 1978 for having helped save Jewish people during Nazi rule. His home town recognised him only after German reunification, with an exhibition of the Schröder couple's life and work at the Max-Samuel-Haus in 2017.

== Works ==
Apart from a few orchestral works, Schröder wrote mainly compositions for small chamber music ensembles, as well as solo sonatas for various instruments, cantatas and a singspiel for children (Hänsel und Gretel). His Divertimento for viola and cello was awarded a prize in Monaco in 1964. The string quartet based on the song of the Moorsoldaten from the Börgermoor concentration camp became world famous.

- Kleine Klaviermusik, piano music, two vol. (1952)
- Musik für Alt-Blockflöte solo, for alto recorder (1954)
- Musik für Viola (oder Violoncello) solo, for viola solo or cello solo (1954)
- Musik für V. solo, for violin (1957)
- Musik für Fagott solo, for bassoon (1958)
- Sonate für Horn solo, for horn (1958)
- Streichquartett über das Lied der Moorsoldaten, for string quartet (1957)
- Hänsel und Gretel – Singspiel für Kinder, for children (1956)
- Cantatas, choral music, lieder, music for home and school
- Sonate für Solo-Flöte (1967)
- Völker der Erde for lower voice, flute and clarinet (1968)
- Metronom 80 for solo violin (1969)
