= Mathilde Monnier =

French choreographer (born 1959)

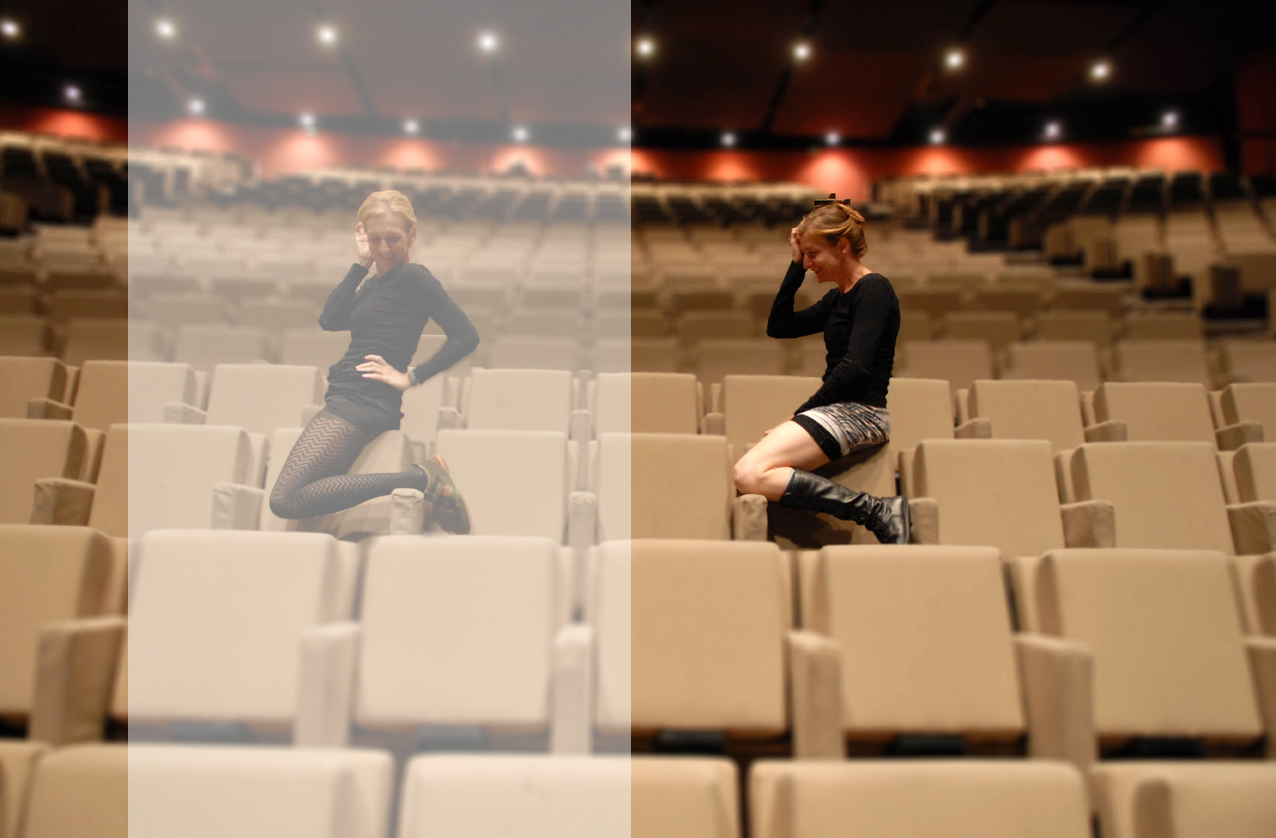
Mathilde Monnier

Mathilde Monnier (born 1959 in Mulhouse) is a French choreographer. She directs the Centre Chorégraphique National de Montpellier Languedoc-Roussillon in Montpellier. She collaborates with notable artists throughout various disciplines, such as philosopher Jean-Luc Nancy, Katerine, novelist Christine Angot, fellow choreographer La Ribot, and composer Heiner Goebbels). Monnier was awarded the Grand Prix National des Arts du Spectacle Vivant (National Award for the Performing Arts awarded by the French Ministry of Culture and Communications) in 1999.

== .External links ==
- Mathilde Monnier: Centre Chorégraphique National de Montpellier Languedoc-Roussillon
- Mathilde Monnier at IMDb France
