= Hans Much =

German author, writer and physician

Hans Much (1880–1932) was a German writer, and physician. His 1903 medical doctoral thesis, Über Todesursachen bei Neugeborenen (On causes of death in newborns), examined neonatal mortality.
