= Gilles Jobin =

Swiss dancer, choreographer and director

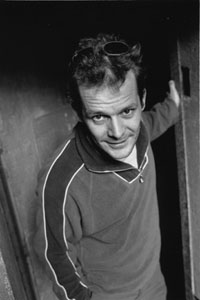
Gilles Jobin in 2000

Gilles Jobin (born 1964) is a Swiss dancer, choreographer and director living and working in Geneva, Switzerland.

== Biography ==
Born in Morges, the son of abstract painter Arthur Jobin, Gilles trained in ballet at the Ecole supérieure de danse de Cannes Rosella Hightower and at the Ballet Junior in Geneva, at the time directed by Beatriz Consuelo. He then danced for Fabienne Berger and Philippe Saire in Lausanne, as well as with Catalan choreographer Àngels Margarit.

== 1990s ==
In 1993, Jobin was appointed director of the Theatre de l'Usine in Geneva where he met María Ribot, also known as La Ribot, a Madrid-born choreographer and dancer who would soon become his partner. In 1995, the couple moved to Madrid and Jobin produced his first three solos, which focused on identity issues: Bloody Mary (1995), Middle Suisse and Only You (1996). In 1997, they left for London since both were drawn to performance art and the Institute of Contemporary Arts’ dynamic programme. There, Jobin received a grant by Artsadmin and was welcomed into that organisation. He then became resident choreographer at Arsenic in Lausanne, where he established his own company Cie Gilles Jobin, producing his first group performance, the trio A+B=X for Les Urbaines, at Arsenic theater. The performance was also presented at Festival Montpellier Danse in 1999 and Jobin was subsequently recognised for the radical nature of his work, acting as a "leader for a new generation of independent Swiss choreographers". In 1998, he produced the duo Macrocosm in London's The Place, relying on choreographic language outside of established aesthetic frameworks that included forays into visual arts and performance art, as in the project Blinded by Love (1998), produced jointly with British performer Franko B. The quintet Braindance was then produced in 1999 and performed at Théâtre de la Ville in Paris, and several international tours followed in Europe and Brazil.

== 2000s ==
In 2001 Jobin produced a major performance in his repertoire, the quintet The Moebius Strip, based on perpetual motion, which enabled him to radicalise his work on horizontality. Unlike his previous works which developed underlying themes of sex, nudity, violence and war, this performance is based on nothing but lines and geometry – echoing the compositions of his father which fluctuate between geometric rigour and the intense vibration of juxtaposed colours. He then followed with the septet Under Construction in 2002 which was described by Marie-Christine Vernay (Libération Next, 2002) as "doubtless one of the most majestic of Gilles Jobin's performances". Two-Thousand-and-Three, created in 2003 for the 22 dancers of the Ballet of the Grand Théâtre de Genève, itself a uniquely contemporary performance that "transcends both classical and contemporary dance" (Marie-Christine Vernay, Libération Next, 12 September 2003) was the last episode in this acclaimed trilogy based on a system of "organically organised movement".

What is striking – and delightful – with Gilles Jobin, is his capacity to take risks by delving deeper into the raw material of dance, namely dancers and their bodies, in each new production. His style of writing – one of the most accomplished of his generation – dodges the traps of narration and puts the focus back on abstraction.

In 2004, Jobin produced Delicado for Lisbon's Ballet Gulbenkian. That same year he moved to Geneva with his family and produced the sextet Steak House in 2005. The following year, the choreographer became associate artist at Bonlieu Scène Nationale in Annecy and produced Double Deux (2006), Text to Speech (2008), a performance which points to his growing interest in new technologies, and Black Swan (2009).

== 2010s ==
In 2010, Jobin produced The Missing Link with the dancers of the Donko Seko Dance Centre in Bamako, Mali. In 2011, he delved deeper into the concept of movement stripped of all narrative structure with Spider Galaxies. In 2012, he was awarded the Collide@CERN prize and thus became the first resident choreographer at CERN (the European Organisation for Nuclear Research). He ended his residency in November 2012 with a conference at CERN's Globe. In 2013, following his residency, he produced QUANTUM within the context of the CMS experiment, in association with German visual artist Julius von Bismarck (winner of the Ars Electronica Prize), American composer Carla Scaletti and Belgian fashion designer Jean-Paul Lespagnard. For QUANTUM, Gilles Jobin and Julius von Bismarck received the support of the Fondation d'entreprise Hermès in the framework of its New Settings programme.

In 2015 Jobin produced the duo FORÇA FORTE inspired by the laws of quantum physics, with his troupe's lead dancer Susana Panadés Diaz. For that performance, the choreographer did his first ever motion capture at Artanim, a Geneva research centre that carries out orthopaedics, sport medicine, 3D animation, virtual reality and enhanced reality projects. That same year he shot the acclaimed 3D film WOMB which premiered in the autumn of 2016 at the 22@th Geneva International Film Festival (GIFF). In 2017 he produced the ground-breaking contemporary dance show in immersive virtual reality VR_I, in association with Artanim, in which five viewers at a time, equipped with VR headsets and on-board computers, are immersed in a virtual environment where they can interact with each other while navigating freely to observe the dancers. The show earned Gilles Jobin the Innovation Award for the most innovative work for new platforms at the 46@th Festival du Nouveau Cinema in Montreal, where it premiered internationally in October 2017. He also earned the FNC EXPLORE Performances/Installations People's Choice Award for the best virtual reality performance. In 2017 his 3D film WOMB wins the award for art and experimental film at San Francisco Dance Film Festival.

In 2018, VR_I was featured at the Sundance Film Festival and the 75th Venice International Film Festival. With nearly 200 international performances, VR_I is the most toured VR installation in the world.

== 2020s ==
In 2020, Compagnie Gilles Jobin creates Dance Trail, a piece in augmented reality at the 2020 Sundance Film Festival, then La Comédie Virtuelle - Live Show, a multiuser VR show in real time selected in official competition at the 77th Venice International Film Festival and which won the Numix 2021 award in the International - Interactive XR Experience category from the XR Quebec industry.

In 2021, Gilles Jobin creates Cosmogony, a live digital performance in real time in his Geneva studios, which is projected 10'000 km away at the Singapore International Festival of the Arts - SIFA and in video mapping 2'000 km away at the Bucharest International Dance Film Festival - BIDFF. In 2022, the company is back at the Sundance Film Festival with Cosmogony.

== Works ==
=== Multimedia works ===
- 2017: VR_I
- 2020 : Dance Trail
- 2020 : La Comédie Virtuelle - Live Show
- 2020 : Virtual Crossings
- 2021 : Cosmogony

=== Films ===
- 2016: WOMB (3D film)

=== Dance ===
- 1995: Bloody Mary
- 1996: Middle Suisse & Only You
- 1997: A+B=X
- 1999: Braindance
- 1999: Macrocosm
- 2001: The Moebius Strip
- 2002: Under Construction
- 2003: Two-Thousand-and-Three (Commissioned for Ballet du Grand Théâtre – Geneva)
- 2004: Delicado (Commissioned for Ballet Gulbenkian – Lisbon)
- 2005: Steak House
- 2006: Double Deux
- 2007: The Moebius Strip & Moebius Kids
- 2008: Text to Speech
- 2009: Black Swan
- 2010: Le Chaînon-manquant – The Missing Link
- 2011: Spider Galaxies
- 2012: SHAKER LOOPS
- 2013: PROTOKIDS
- 2013: QUANTUM
- 2015: FORÇA FORTE

== Awards ==
- 2000 Young Creator Prize awarded by the Vaud Foundation for Artistic Promotion

Furthermore, Vincent Pluss' films and documentaries dedicated to The Moebius Strip and Braindance and Luc Peter's Le Voyage de Moebius have been screened in a number of international festivals and have received many awards.

- 2001 New Choreographic Talent Prize awarded by the SACD
- 2004 Leenards Foundation Cultural Prize
- 2012 Collide@CERN Prize
- 2015 Swiss Grand Award for Dance awarded by the Federal Office of Culture
- 2017 Festival du Nouveau Cinema – FNC EXPLORE (Montreal) Innovation Award for the most innovative work for new platforms for VR_I
- 2017 FNC EXPLORE Performances/Installations People's Choice Award for the best performance for VR_I
- 2017: Best Art and Experimental Film award at the San Francisco Dance Film Festival for WOMB
- 2021: NUMIX 2021 Prize in the International – Interactive XR Experience category for his play La Comédie Virtuelle
