= Annemie Vanackere =

Belgian theatre manager

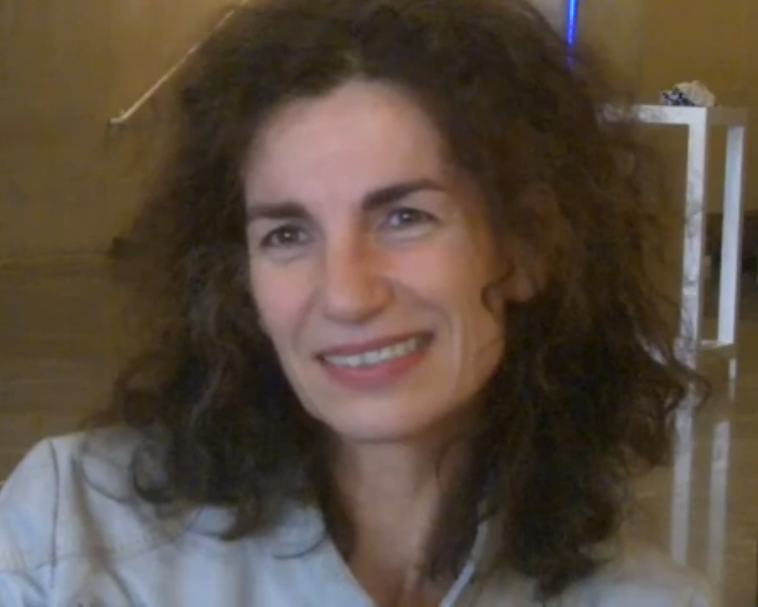
- In a 2011 interview
- Born: 1966 (age 59–60); Kortrijk, Belgium
- Occupations: Festival curator, theatre director

Annemie Vanackere (born 1966) is a Belgian festival curator and theatre director. Since 2012, she has been the artistic director and managing director of the Hebbel am Ufer Theatre in Berlin.

== Life ==
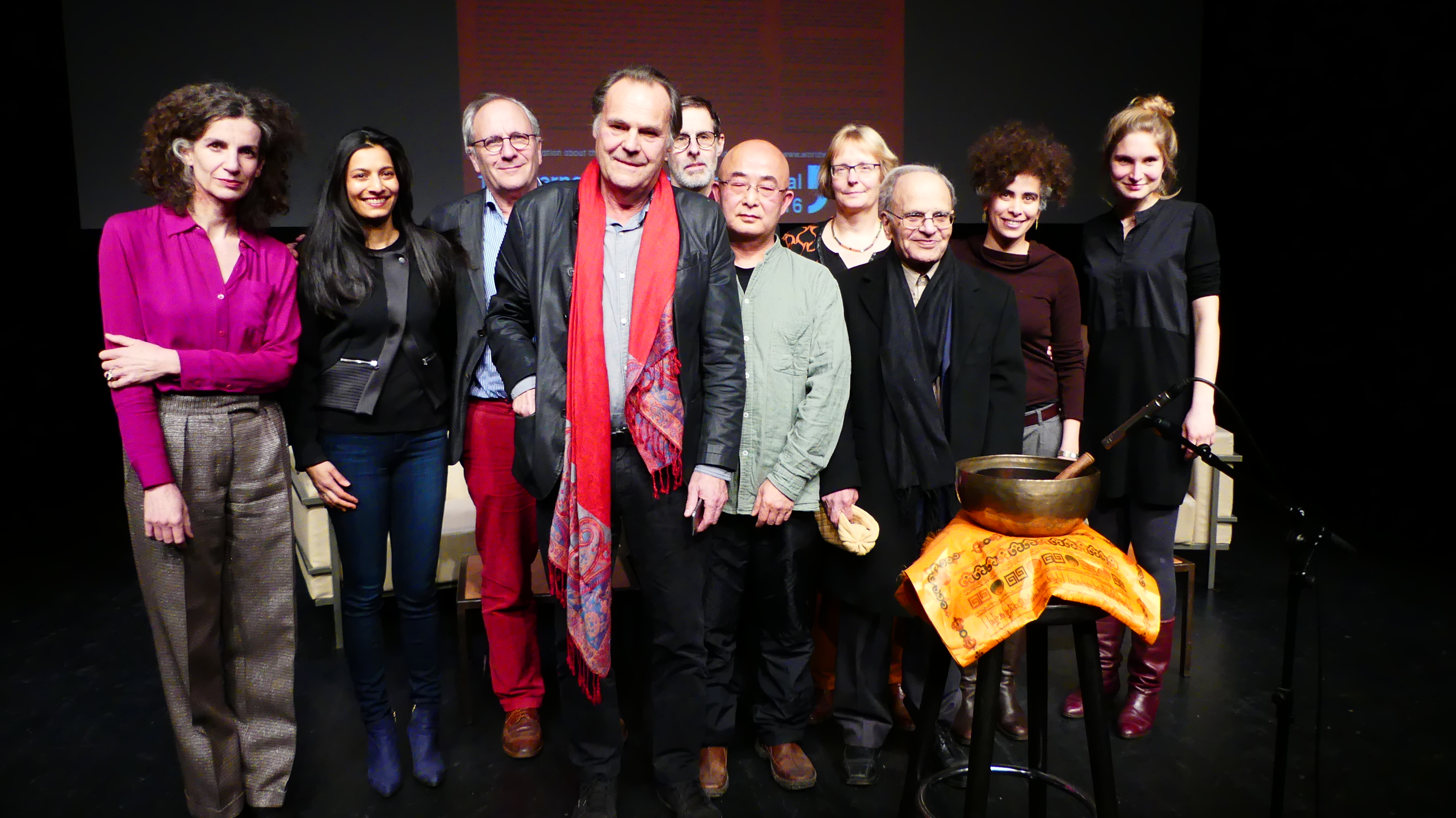
Worldwide reading for Ashraf Fayadh (2016) at Hebbel am Ufer (Annemie Vanackere outside left))

Born in Kortrijk, Vanackere studied theatre and cinema for one year in Leuven and philosophy in Leuven and Paris. where she also attended seminars by Jacques Derrida at the Sorbonne. She worked as a production manager before taking over as artistic director of the Nieuwpoorttheater in Ghent in 1993. From 1995 to 2011, she was employed at the Rotterdamse Schouwburg, since 2001 as artistic co-director as well as director of the Productiehuis Rotterdam, which is affiliated to the Schouwburg. Until 2011, Vanackere was artistic director of the international theatre, dance and performance festival in Rotterdam, "De Internationale Keuze van de Rotterdamse Schouwburg", which she co-founded in 2001.

In February 2012, Vanackere moved to Berlin and took over as artistic director and managing director of the Theater Hebbel am Ufer (HAU) there in September. Her contract was extended three times during her directorship and the latest renewal will keep her to 2028 at HAU. In 2020, Vanackere was one of the initiators of the Initiative GG 5.3 Weltoffenheit.

Vanackere is a member of the advisory board of the Einstein Stiftung Berlin.

== Publications ==
As editor

- with Sarah Reimann: Utopie und Feminismus, series HKW – 100 Jahre Gegenwart Band 008. Matthes & Seitz Berlin, 2018, ISBN 978-3-95757-414-5.

== Films ==
As co-producer

- 2019 The Great Pretender, director: Zachary Oberzan (US)
