= Federal Office of Culture =

- (in German) Bundesamt für Kultur (in French) Office fédéral de la culture (in Italian) Ufficio federale della cultura (in Romansh) Uffizi federal da cultura

Agency overview
- Jurisdiction: Federal administration of Switzerland
- Headquarters: Bern
- Minister responsible: Alain Berset, Federal Councillor
- Parent agency: Federal Department of Home Affairs
- Website: www.bak.admin.ch

The Federal Office of Culture (FOC) (Note: German: Bundesamt für Kultur, French: Office fédéral de la culture, Italian: Ufficio federale della cultura, Romansh: Uffizi federal da cultura) is an administrative unit of the Federal Department of Home Affairs, based in Bern, Switzerland. The agency has two extensive areas of responsibility: promoting Swiss culture and preserving the country’s cultural heritage. In 2014, its total budget was close to 170 million francs. The FOC promotes culture in the fields of literature, theatre, dance, music, film, the visual arts and design. It helps preserve the cultural heritage by supporting the protection of monuments and archeological research, and it also maintains valuable collections, libraries, archives, and museums.

From 2005 to 2013, Jean-Frédéric Jauslin was director of the Federal Office of Culture. He was succeeded by Isabelle Chassot, who directed the office from 2013 to 2021. In 2022, Carine Bachmann became the director of the Office.

== History ==
The Federal Office of Culture was established in 1973 as a simple administrative service to coordinate cultural activities. The Clottu-Report, commissioned by the Federal Department of Home Affairs and published in 1975, inventoried Switzerland’s cultural tools and assets and presented proposals for a cultural policy. The report recommended the creation of a new article in the constitution to define the authority of the federal government in the cultural domain. However, it was not until 1999, after a series of difficult referendums and in the context of the total revision of the Federal Constitution that the role of the federal government in arts and culture was inscribed in the constitution (Art 69 FC). To implement this "Culture Article", as it came to be known, the FOC drafted a Law for the Promotion of Culture. It was adopted by parliament on 11 December 2009, and became effective on 1 January 2012.

== Legal principles ==
The cultural role of the federal government is defined in articles 69, 70, and 71 of the Federal Constitution.

Whereas cultural affairs are generally the responsibility of the cantons (article 1 of the Federal Constitution), the federal government "may support cultural efforts of nationwide interest and promote art and music, especially in the field of education" (article 69). In doing so the federal government always takes into consideration the "cultural and linguistic diversity of the country" (article 69). The federal government is responsible for film (article 71) and the preservation and promotion of multilingualism (article 70). In the public interest the federal authorities also preserve and protect "landscapes, the overall appearance of towns or villages, historic sites, as well as natural and cultural monuments" (article).

== Organization ==
The Federal Office of Culture is divided into two sections which disseminate culture and promote culture, respectively. The organization chart shows the following internal departments:

- Preservation and dissemination of cultural heritage
  - Swiss National Library
  - Museums and collections
  - Cultural heritage preservation and protection of monuments
- Cultural production and cultural diversity
  - Culture and society
  - Cultural production
  - Film

== See also ==
- Swiss National Library
- Swiss National Museum
- Swiss Theater Awards

== Full-time positions since 2001 ==
Raw data

"Federal Finance Administration FFA: State financial statements".
"Federal Finance Administration FFA: Data portal".
