= Yen Han (dancer) =

Yen Han (Chinese 韩海燕) is a principal soloist of Ballett Zürich. In addition to her career as a ballerina, she serves as artistic director and choreographer for her own ballet school, theYen Han Dance Center, in Zürich, Switzerland.

Her repertoire consists of leading parts in great ballets from the classical period such as Giselle, La fille mal gardée, La Sylphide, Swan Lake, and The Nutcracker, as well as solo parts in ballets from the 20th and 21st centuries, many of which were world premieres.

== Youth and education ==
Yen Han was raised in Los Angeles as part of an artistic family from China. Her mother Dr. You-Whai Tsao was a concert pianist who studied under professor Guangren Zhou, himself regarded as "the soul of piano education in China" and the most influential and authoritative Chinese pianist. Yen's father Vi Han is a composer, and her uncle Dali Cao is a painter and professor at the Beijing Art Academy who was awarded the title First Class Artist of China.

Yen received her first ballet training from Stefan Mucsi and Paul Maure in Los Angeles. At the age of sixteen she moved to China to continue her studies at the Beijing Dance Academy. In 1991, she reached the semifinal at the Prix de Lausanne and subsequently joined the Jeune Ballet de France and the Ballet de l'Opéra de Nice (France).

== Principal dancer at Ballet Zurich ==
Since 1994, Yen has been a principal soloist of the ballet company at the Zürich Opera House.

In 1995, she was chosen by 89-year-old Nicholas Beriozoff to dance the title role in The Firebird in the form he himself had experienced while working with Mikhail Fokine many years earlier. Subsequently, she took on parts in further reconstructions of historic ballets: by Millicent Hodson and Kenneth Archer - Nijinsky's original version of Le sacre du printemps (Zurich, 1995) as well as Jean Börlin's futuristic ballet from 1922 Skating Rink (Zurich, 1996) - and more recently by Alexey Ratmansky, in his reconstruction of the original choreography of Swan Lake (Zurich, 2016).

Furthermore, Yen Han danced as a protagonist in ballets by Patrice Bart, Bernd Roger Bienert, Mauro Bigonzetti, William Forsythe, Lionel Hoche, Johan Kobborg, Jiří Kylián, Paul Lightfoot & Sol Leon, Hans van Manen, Lin Hwai-min, Filipe Portugal, Heinz Spoerli, Christian Spuck, Alexey Ratmansky, Martin Schläpfer, Twyla Tharp, Jorma Uotinen and Christopher Wheeldon.

Mats Ek chose her as Aurora for his Sleeping Beauty in Zurich in 2011. Two years later, he invited her as a guest to Stockholm to perform Juliet in the world premiere run of his Romeo and Juliet.

During the present tenure at Ballet Zurich of Christian Spuck, Yen Han continues to appear regularly in her classical repertoire, such as Giselle (choreography: Patrice Bart) and Romeo and Juliet (choreography: Christian Spuck). At the same time, she takes on roles which demand new forms of expression and acting skills. Thus, during the 2016/17 season she danced leading parts in world premieres by Filipe Portugal (disTANZ) and Christian Spuck (Messa da Requiem).

Her comic talent found an outlet in a role Christian Spuck created for her in his new ballet Nussknacker und Mausekönig (October 2017), where Yen interprets the Female Clown. In this production she danced at the Bolshoi Theatre in Moscow in November.

== Stage partners ==
Yen's regular stage partners have included American ballet star Ethan Stiefel, the current Royal Ballet principal Federico Bonelli, and the current Bolshoi Ballet principal Semyon Chudin. In Japan, she danced Juliet with Tetsuya Kumakawa's Romeo in Heinz Spoerli's Romeo and Juliet. In 2009, Roberto Bolle invited her to his gala "Roberto Bolle and Friends" which was filmed for DVD in the Boboli Gardens in Florence and performed at Teatro La Fenice in Venice (Italy).

== Worldwide tours and guest performances ==
As a guest and with Ballet Zurich Yen Han tours throughout Europe, North and South America, Africa and Asia.

Amongst others, she danced at the Bolshoi Theatre, Moscow (Russia), the Salzburg Festival (Austria), International Dance Summer, Innsbruck (Austria), Sadler's Wells Theatre London and the Edinburgh Festival (UK), Ankara International Music Festival and the "Ballet Days" at the Istanbul State Opera and Ballet Theatre (Turkey), Festival "Basel Tantz" (Switzerland), Cologne Opera, Ludwigsburger Schlossfestspiele, Festspielhaus Baden-Baden and Frankfurt Opera (Germany), Maison de la Danse, Lyon and Théâtre du Châtelet, Paris (France), Granada Festival, Gran Teatre del Liceu, Barcelona, and Teatro Arriaga, Bilbao (Spain), Het Muziekteater Amsterdam (Netherlands), Royal Opera Stockholm (Sweden), Ancient Theatre of Taormina, Teatro Carlo Felice, Genoa, Teatro La Fenice Venice and Boboli Gardens, Florence (Italy), in Aspendos and Athens (Greece), in Winnipeg, Tel Aviv, Johannesburg, Cape Town, Hong Kong (Hong Kong Arts Festival), Beijing, Shanghai, Taipei, Bangkok, Singapore, Nagoya and Tokyo (Orchard Hall) as well as the United States.

== Educational work ==
Yen founded her own ballet school, the Yen Han Dance Center in Zurich, with her husband Matthias Zinser and has been teaching, coaching and choreographing there since 2012.

== Appreciation ==
In 2013, while bestowing the first Swiss Dance Award upon her, choreographer and jury member Brigitta Luisa Merki said that "Yen Han is one of Switzerland's best-known female dancers. Her successful career has been a constant stream of outstanding performances in both classical and contemporary dance. Her virtuosity, coupled with a fantastic versatility in the interpretation of a wide range of roles, makes Yen Han a truly exceptional dancer and an extraordinary artist."

The Swiss Theatre Encyclopedia singled Yen Han out as a dancer "with beautiful lines and a delicate aura".

Swiss daily newspaper Blick wrote about Yen's appearance as The Chosen One in Heinz Spoerli's Le sacre du printemps in March 2001: "Yen Han epitomizes emancipation. The top dancer, the well-behaved child Marie in the 'Nutcracker', bashful 'Juliet', the fragile firebird appears transformed into a wild, uninhibited, erotic woman."

In 2011, Swiss daily newspaper Neue Zürcher Zeitung (NZZ) described her appearance in the title role of Mats Ek's Sleeping Beauty: "Her defiant glance, her sweeping momentum, those hunchbacked, fast movements, this rage and at the same time forsakenness within her family and the world – incredible how this delicate dancer, who is well-known as a refined classical ballerina, absorbs the Swede's choreographic vocabulary. … And yet, this evening belongs to Yen Han. She dances her Aurora as if she'd never danced anything else than Mats Ek's ballets, grotesque and fragile at the same time. Thus, she has irrevocably danced into the squad of world-class dancers."

Heinz Spoerli, who as Zurich's ballet director created many of Yen's roles, wrote about her in the following way: "Yen is an incredible dancer. She permanently changes her colour. She is poignant in her creativity. She has the ability to turn every emotion, however tiny, into movement, and that is extremely rare."

In December 2016, NZZ wrote about her performance in the world premiere of Christian Spuck's Messa da Requiem, which was both televised on Swiss National Television and the German-French cultural channel ARTE and released on DVD: "Not until the pas de deux of Yen Han and Filipe Portugal during Agnus Dei did the stage turn into danced transcendency. It is impressive how the arms of the dancers melt into endless lines, how Yen Han's introspective demeanour attains an absence of gravity which becomes the climax of the evening. Here, dance develops a power of its own which enables you to experience the music in a different way and more enriching to your soul."

== Awards ==
- 2017: Nomination as dancer of the year by the international trade publication for the dance industry Tanz.
- 2013: Swiss Dance Award (Outstanding Female Dancer), bestowed upon her by the Swiss Federal Office of Culture BAK. Award accorded for the first time.
- 2013: Dance Prize of the Friends of Ballet Zurich. Accorded for the first time.
- Two further nominations by the international trade publication for the dance industry Tanz.
- "Stern der Woche" (Star of the Week) awarded by Munich daily newspaper Abendzeitung for her performance as Juliet.

== Films and DVD ==
- Cello Suites. Ballet by Heinz Spoerli (2006)
- Peer Gynt. Ballet by Heinz Spoerli (2009)
- Spoerli – ich bin Tanzmacher. Portrait of Heinz Spoerli (2010)
- Roberto Bolle. Mia Danza (2010)
- Dance & Quartet. Heinz Spoerli’s ballet Death and the Maiden, filmed at the Salzburg Festival, music performed by the Hagen Quartet (2012)
- Messa da Requiem. Ballet by Christian Spuck (2017)
