= Hebbel am Ufer =

Coordinates: 52.5004°N 13.3873°E

- Formation: 2003
- Type: Theatre group
- Location: Berlin
- Artistic director: Annemie Vanackere
- Website: www.hebbel-am-ufer.de/en/

The Hebbel am Ufer (HAU) is a German theater company and international performance center in Berlin. It has three physical locations (HAU1, HAU2, and HAU3), and a digital theatre (HAU4).

== History ==
HAU was founded in 2003, before the 2003/04 season, by combining three theaters in Kreuzberg, Berlin:

- Hebbel Theater (now called HAU1),
- Theater am Halleschen Ufer (theater at Hallesches Ufer) (now called HAU2), and
- Theater am Ufer (now called HAU3).

The founding artistic director was Matthias Lilienthal until July 2012, when he was succeeded by the Belgian Annemie Vanackere. As of March 2024 Annemie Vanackere is artistic director of HAU.

== Locations ==
- HAU1 is at the old Hebbel Theater at Stresemannstr. 29, 10963 Berlin. This location is wheelchair-accessible, and has barrier-free restrooms available.
- HAU2 is at Hallesches Ufer 34, 10963 Berlin. This location is wheelchair-accessible, and has barrier-free restrooms available.
- HAU3 at Tempelhofer Ufer 10, 10963 Berlin. This location is not wheelchair-accessible and located on the 3rd floor, accessible only via a staircase.

HAU4 is a digital space, online.

== Governance and funding ==
The Hebbel am Ufer is funded with 4 million euros by the State of Berlin and various foundations and organizations in Berlin as well as in the rest of Germany. Its mission is to protect and support the tradition of the Hebbel Theater, which is to provide space and infrastructure for different international and national theater, dance and performance events.

The HAU is known for international productions in various performing arts.

== Notable performances ==
Swiss director Milo Rau's The Last Days of the Ceausescus' (Die letzten Tage der Ceausescus) premiered at Hebbel am Ufer in 2009.
