= Eleanor Bauer =

American choreographer and dancer

Eleanor Bauer is an American choreographer and dancer.

== Early life and education ==
Eleanor Bauer studied at the Idyllwild Arts Academy (1997–2000) in California and subsequently the NYU School of the Arts (2000–2003).

After completing her bachelor's degree in dance, she choreographed and danced in different places in New York, including Danspace Project, The Kitchen, Symphony Space, LaMaMa ETC, Joe's Pub, Judson Church, Joyce SoHo, Dixon Place, OfficeOps, and Ur, The Dance Palace. In 2004, she went to Brussels to study at the dance school P.A.R.T.S., where she completed the Research Cycle (2004–2006). She currently is a PhD candidate in Choreography at the Stockholm University of the Arts.

== Career ==
=== Choreography ===
Bauer's work is at the intersection of choreography, dance, text, music and performance. Her productions vary in size and used media, and focus on questioning categories, production methods and ways of thinking performance. In her work, she utilizes the strict codes and concepts of contemporary dance in a shrewd and subtle way, with an expressive directness that tends toward cabaret and vaudeville.

Bauer created her first solo production, ELEANOR! (Eleanor Bauer/GoodMove, 2005) while still studying at P.A.R.T.S.. Afterwards, a wide range of productions followed, including a trilogy consisting of A Dance for the Newest Age (the triangle piece) (Eleanor Bauer/GoodMove, 2011), Tentative Assembly (the tent piece) (Eleanor Bauer/GoodMove, 2012) and Midday and Eternity (the time piece) (Eleanor Bauer/GoodMove, 2013). This trilogy utilizes three-fold paradigms such as past-present-future and nature-society-spirituality to approach the holistic nature of dance and choreography. From 2013 to 2016, Eleanor Bauer was an artist-in-residence in the Brussels Kaaitheater. In 2013, she launched BAUER HOUR (Eleanor Bauer/GoodMove, 2013), an episodic variété show that ran monthly at the Kaaistudios, toured regularly and is featured on Vimeo. In the autumn of 2015, she developed two PROTO TALKS (Eleanor Bauer/GoodMove, 2016) with artists in the Kaaitheater: one with choreographer / dancer Michiel Vandevelde and one with choreographer / dancer Mette Ingvartsen. In the spring of 2016, she premiered Meyoucycle , a concert performance in collaboration with composer / musician Chris Peck and the contemporary music ensemble Ictus. Both Meyoucycle and Tentative Assembly (the tent piece) were featured at the Brussels Kunstenfestivaldesarts. NEW JOY, a musical theater production, premiered in February–March 2019 at Schauspielhaus Bochum.

Since 2007 the performances of Bauer have been produced by Good Move vzw, an organization that she founded for this purpose in Brussels.

=== Performance ===
As a performer Bauer has collaborated with the choreographers Trisha Brown, Boris Charmatz, Anne Teresa de Keersmaeker/Rosas, Mette Ingvartsen, Xavier Le Roy en David Zambrano; the visual artists Matthew Barney en Emily Roysdon; the music ensemble Ictus and the electronic music duo The Knife.

=== Writing and research ===
Bauer also writes about dance. She published in Off Off Off, New York's Movement Research Performance Journal, Maska (Ljubjana), and NDT of Contredanse (Brussels), as well as in various publications of Sarma, Everybody's, Nadine, and P.A.R.T.S.. For the Sarma project B-Chronicles Eleanor Bauer took a series of 46 interviews with artists, critics, producers and dramatic advisers from the Brussels dance community, including herself. The interviews formed an inspiration for events and publications by other project staff, were processed into online records containing a photo, bio, abstract, audio and cartographic drawings. In 2008, she participated in 6M1L (6 Months 1 Location), a collective research residence initiated by Xavier Le Roy and Bojana Cvejic at CCNM Center Choréographique National Montpellier.

=== Teaching ===
Bauer is also active as a lecturer. In that context she created some performances with students: Parliament Without Words (Eleanor Bauer, with students of P.A.R.T.S., 2011), Another Song (Eleanor Bauer and Sandy Williams, with students of P.A.R.T.S., 2014), Medium (Eleanor Bauer, with students of KASK, 2015), Being Robert Plutchik (Eleanor Bauer, with students of KASK, 2015) and OUROBORACULAR (Eleanor Bauer, with students of DOCH, School of Dance and Circus, 2017) Together with Vlad Ionescu, she coached the production of Slogan for Modern Times , a duet made by Kathryn Vickers and Inga Huld Hákonardóttir in 2015 at wpZimmer, a residency space for the performing arts in Antwerp, Belgium.

Inspired by all kinds of open source initiatives, she has set up the project Nobody's Business together with the choreographer / dancer Ellen Söderhult and the choreographer / dancer Alice Chauchat. Its purpose is to facilitate the collective production and dissemination of knowledge in the performing arts by sharing practices and documentation about it. In the course of 2015 and 2016, Nobody's Business organized nine meetings of approximately five days each in Belgium, Denmark, Germany, Italy, Norway, the United States and Sweden. Eleanor Bauer was involved as a facilitator in four of these meetings: Nobody's Dance Stockholm December 2015, Nobody's Dance Brussels January 2016, Nobody's Dance Milan April 2016 and Nobody's Indiscipline Brussels November 2016. For the period 2017–2022, Eleanor Bauer is a PhD candidate in Choreography at the Stockholm University of the Arts, where she also lectures. In 2017 she also gives workshops at b12 (Berlin), ImPulsTanz – Vienna International Dance Festival and the Practicing Performance – International Dance Festival at The Ohio State University in Columbus.

== Other activities ==
Bauer has also created or contributed to a number of special projects. In 2011, she participated together with choreographer / dancer Daniel Linehan in the Kaaitheater in Walk + Talk, a programme series by choreographer / dancer Philipp Gehmacher in which choreographers talk about their movement language. She participated in Hannah Hurtzig's Black Market for Useful and Non-Useful Knowledge at the In-Presentable Festival in Madrid in 2012. In 2014, she collaborated with composer Chris Peck on This is Not a Pop Song (II), for which the music ensemble Ictus asked five composers to write a new work for instruments that are typically for pop music and that has the length of a pop song, but without the pop music. Together with Chris Peck, she is also involved in heart the band/hear the bend, a performance collective including Beth Gill, Jon Moniaci and Chase Granoff, that has been active since 2004. Under the title Untitled, Untempered, Untamed, Eleanor Bauer creates solo performances / lectures involving speaking, dancing, singing, hanging out with the audience, relationships with things that belong to the time and place of the performance, and relationships with things that don’t belong to the time and place of the performance. She was also host of the release of the book Moving Together: Theorizing and Making Contemporary Dance by the Belgian cultural sociologist Rudi Laermans at the Kaaistudios in Brussels in 2015.

== Productions ==
Own productions:

- ELEANOR! (Eleanor Bauer/GoodMove, 2005)
- Dig My Aura (Eleanor Bauer, 2006)
- AT LARGE (Eleanor Bauer/GoodMove, 2008)
- (BIG GIRLS DO BIG THINGS) (Eleanor Bauer/GoodMove, 2010)
- A Dance for the Newest Age (the triangle piece) (Eleanor Bauer/GoodMove, 2011)
- The Heather Lang Show by Eleanor Bauer and Vice Versa (Eleanor Bauer/GoodMove, 2012)
- Tentative Assembly (the tent piece) (Eleanor Bauer/GoodMove, 2012)
- Midday and Eternity (the time piece) (Eleanor Bauer/GoodMove, 2013)
- Prelude/Epilogue (Eleanor Bauer/Good Move, 2013)
- BAUER HOUR (Eleanor Bauer/GoodMove, 2013)
- a v i g n o n s e n s e (Eleanor Bauer/GoodMove and Veli Lehtovaara, 2015)
- PROTO TALKS (Eleanor Bauer/GoodMove, 2016)
- Meyoucycle (Eleanor Bauer en Chris Peck /GoodMove & Ictus, 2016)

With Boris Charmatz:

- levée des conflits (Boris Charmatz/musée de la danse, 2010)
- enfant (Boris Charmatz/musée de la danse, 2011)

Eleanor Bauer collaborated on the staging of the ‘living exhibition’ expo zero (Boris Charmatz/musée de la danse, 2011) as part of Performa 11 (New York, 2011) and 20 Dancers for the 20th Century (Boris Charmatz/musée de la danse, 2011).

With Xavier Le Roy:

- Low Pieces (Xavier Le Roy, 2009–2011)
- “Retrospective” (Xavier Le Roy, in: MoMA PS1, New York, October – December 2014)

With Matthew Barney:

- River of Fundament (film) (Matthew Barney and Jonathan Bepler, 2014)
- REDOUBT (film) (Matthew Barney, 2017)

With others:

- Portrait of The Family (Ivy Baldwin, 2003)
- This is a tree dance (Karinne Keithley Syers, 2004)
- UN ELEPHANT TERRIBLE (Chris Yon, 2004)
- Soul Project (David Zambrano, 2006)
- Why We Love Action (Mette Ingvartsen, 2007)
- Floor of the Forest (Trisha Brown, 1970 – performed at Documenta 12, 2007)
- Accumulation (Trisha Brown, 1971 – performed at Documenta 12, 2007)
- The Song (Anne Teresa De Keersmaeker/Rosas, Ann Veronica Janssens and Michel François, 2009)
- By any other name (Emily Roysdon, 2013–2014)

== Sources ==
- Official website of Eleanor Bauer / Good Move vzw
- Kunstenpunt – Persons – Eleanor Bauer according to the Flemish Arts Institute
- Performing Arts in Flanders » Producers » GoodMove/Eleanor Bauer according to the Flemish Arts Institute
