= Beltrão =

Beltrao or Beltrão is a Portuguese surname. Notable people with the surname include:

- Andréa Beltrão (born 1963), Brazilian actress and playwright
- Bruno Beltrão (born 1979), Brazilian choreographer
- Jacquie Beltrao (born 1965), Irish sports presenter and journalist
- Jorge Beltrão Negromonte da Silveira (born 1961), Brazilian serial killer and cannibal
- José Beltrão (1905–1948), Brazilian equestrian
- Romeu Beltrão (1913–1997), Brazilian physician, educator, historian and paleontologist
- Yolanda Beltrão de Azevedo (born 1911), Brazilian supercentenarian
