= Five Easy Pieces (disambiguation) =

Five Easy Pieces is a 1970 American drama film.

Five Easy Pieces may also refer to:

- Five Easy Pieces (Stravinsky), a composition by Igor Stravinsky
- Five Easy Pieces (TV series), a 1980 Chinese TV series
- Five Easy Pieces (Milo Rau), a 2016 theatre production by Milo Rau
- Five Easy Pieces (Waller), an EP by composer Michael Waller

== See also ==
- Six Easy Pieces, a book by physicist Richard Feynman
