= KFDA =

KFDA may refer to:

- KFDA-TV, a television station in Amarillo, Texas, US
- Kunstenfestivaldesarts, an annual arts festival held in Brussels, Belgium
- Ministry of Food and Drug Safety, Republic of Korea, formerly known as the Korea Food and Drug Administration (KFDA)
