= Ula Sickle =

Canadian-Polish choreographer and performer

Ula Sickle is a Canadian / Polish choreographer and performer residing in the Brussels-Capital Region.

== Training ==
Ula Sickle studied art history and semiotics at the University of Toronto and then performing arts at the Université Paris 8. Afterwards she moved to Brussels, where she studied at the dance school P.A.R.T.S. from 2000 to 2004. From 2008 to 2010, she continued to deepen her knowledge in visual arts and film during studies at Le Fresnoy - Studio National des Arts Contemporains in Tourcoing.

== Work as a choreographer ==
Since 2004, Sickle has worked as an independent choreographer. Her artistic work takes on different forms, from video to installations and stage performances. Since 2004, she made twelve stage performances, a video and an installation. The work was presented at, among others, Kaaitheater, KVS and Kunstenfestivaldesarts (Brussels), ImPulsTanz and TanzQuartier (Vienna), Teatr Nowy (Warsaw, Zodiac & Moving in November festival (Helsinki), Reykjavik Dance Festival, Tangente (Montreal), B:OM festival (Seoul), Zürcher Theater Spektakel (Zürich) and les Rencontres chorégraphiques internationales de Seine-Saint-Denis (Paris).

== Collaborations ==
Sickle often collaborates with artists from other domains such as visual arts (e.g., Alexis Destoop and Daniela Bershan), contemporary music (e.g., Yann Leguay, Peter Lenaerts and Stine Janvin Motland) or architecture (e.g., Laurent Liefooghe). With Alexis Destoop and Peter Lenaerts, she began during her studies at P.A.R.T.S. also the collective Rebecca September, which resulted in the production Knockout (Rebecca September, 2005). For Viewmaster (2007-2008) and Viewmaster Series (2010-2012) she worked together with the dancer and performance artist Heike Langsdorf. With Heike Langsdorf, Christophe Meierhans and Christoph Ragg (together C&H), she also collaborated on their performance The Nickelodeon (C&H, 2008). Before she was a dancer in Vost (Mårten Spångberg, 2004). In 2017 she collaborates as a choreographer on the production 7EVEN, that is based on The 7 Necessities, the artistic manifesto of choreographer / dancer Emio Greco and choreographer / director Pieter C. Scholten. It consists of seven new works of seven minutes created by seven artists and performed by seven dancers of the Ballet National Marseille and ICK.

== Alternative canon for contemporary dance ==
In her productions Sickle is looking for ways to open the canon of contemporary dance, which is strongly influenced by evolutions in Europe and North America. That prompted her to seek performers who embody another movement history. A point of departure is her interest in contemporary popular music and dance, such as found in, among others, the nightclubs of the Congolese capital Kinshasa. Contemporary popular music and dance are often claimed to be commercial and standardized, and they would foster the blurring of moral standards and social escapism. But because they can cross language barriers, they make cultural exchanges widely possible in a globalized world. In the productions Solid Gold (Sickle, Dinozord and Yann Leguay, 2010), Jolie (Ula Sickle, Yann Leguay and Jolie Ngemi, 2011) and Kinshasa Electric (Sickle, Popol Amisi, Daniela Bershan, Jeannot Kumbonyeki and Joel Tenda, 2014), Ula Sickle therefore worked with Congolese performers whose diverse and complex background is far from her own Western dance background. In the productions, she follows the individual history of the dancers and the way in which their movements are culturally and politically colored. But Ula Sickle not only works with non-Western dancers to break the canon of contemporary dance, in Extreme Tension (Ula Sickle, Marie De Corte and Yann Leguay, 2012–14) she worked with an older dancer. Her interest in globalized pop culture, not only as music but also as a web of references, trends, attitudes and gestures, was also the basis of Extended Play (2016), in which she collaborated again with Daniela Bershan (aka DJ Baba Electronics).

== Dialogue between body and technology ==
In Extended Play, Sickle uses a specially designed musical app for IPad (created by French beat boxer and programmer Black Adopo) and wireless microphones, allowing the performers to compose and play the music live. Technology and the relationship between man and device is another common thread through her productions. Bodies engage in dialogue with smartphones, amplifiers, microphones or light sources. In Prelude (Sickle, Stine Janvin Motland and Yann Leguay, 2014), subtle live sound modeling often makes it unclear whether Stine Janvin Motland, known for her original extensive vocal techniques, sings or that her faint sounds are manipulated digitally. In Light Solos (Sickle and Yann Leguay, 2011-2013), stroboscopes play a crucial role. The flashes of darkness and light follow each other at an extreme pace, so the viewer can never see the dancer in her totality, but only in fragments that already disappear when they appear. In this way Sickle examines how the sensory and cognitive experience of reality is mediated by technology.

== Videos and installations ==
In addition to her stage performances, Sickle also makes audiovisual work, often associated with her stage performances. The video Atomic 5.1 (2010) is based on one of her Light Solos (Ula Sickle and Yann Leguay, 2011-2013). The video installation Looping the Loop (2009), which focuses on a young Congolese hiphopper, was at the origin of Solid Gold (Ula Sickle, Dinozord and Yann Leguay, 2010). Both works were produced by Le Fresnoy during her residence there.

== Exhibitions ==
In 2017 Sickle was artist in residence at Ujazdowski Castle, Center for Contemporary Art in Warsaw. The following year she had her first solo show at the museum.

== Productions ==
- figure f (Ula Sickle, 2004)
- Knockout (Rebecca September, 2005)
- Im/possible figures (Ula Sickle, 2006)
- Viewmaster (Ula Sickle, Heike Langsdorf and Laurent Liefooghe, 2007-2008)
- Viewmaster Series (Ula Sickle, Heike Langsdorf and Laurent Liefooghe, 2010 - 2012)
- Solid Gold (Ula Sickle, Dinozord and Yann Leguay, 2010)
- Jolie (Ula Sickle, Yann Leguay and Jolie Ngemi, 2011)
- Light Solos (Ula Sickle and Yann Leguay, 2011-2013)
- Extreme Tension (Ula Sickle, Marie de Corte and Yann Leguay, 2012–14)
- Kinshasa Electric (Ula Sickle, Popol Amisi, Daniela Bershan, Jeannot Kumbonyeki and Joel Tenda, 2014)
- Prelude (Ula Sickle, Stine Janvin Motland and Yann Leguay, 2014)
- Voor Ons (Ula Sickle, 2015)
- Extended Play (Ula Sickle and Daniela Bershan, 2016)
- Borrowed Time (Ula Sickle, 2017), as part of 7even (Nacera Belaza, Amos Ben-Tal, Eric Minh Cuong Castaing, Joeri Dubbe, Faustin Linyekula, Ayelen Parolin and Ula Sickle, 2017)
- Tunings (Ula Sickle and Stine Janvin, 2017)
- Free Gestures - Wolne Gesty (Ula Sickle, 2018)
- Relay (Ula Sickle, 2018)

== Audiovisual productions ==
- Looping the Loop (Ula Sickle, 2009)
- Atomic 5.1 (Ula Sickle, 2010)
