= NTGent =

Theatre company in Ghent, Belgium

NTGent, originally Nederlands Toneel Gent, is a theatre company in Ghent, Belgium. Subtitled "Het Stadtstheater van de Toekomst" (the City Theatre of the Future), it is especially known for the avant garde theatre produced by Milo Rau, who was artistic director from 2018 until January 2023. As of 2024, there are three co-directors: Yves Degryse, Barbara Raes, and Melih Gençboyacı, while Rau is responsible for the 2023–2024 artistic programme.

The company is based at the Royal Dutch Theatre (Koninklijke Nederlandse Schouwburg).

== History ==
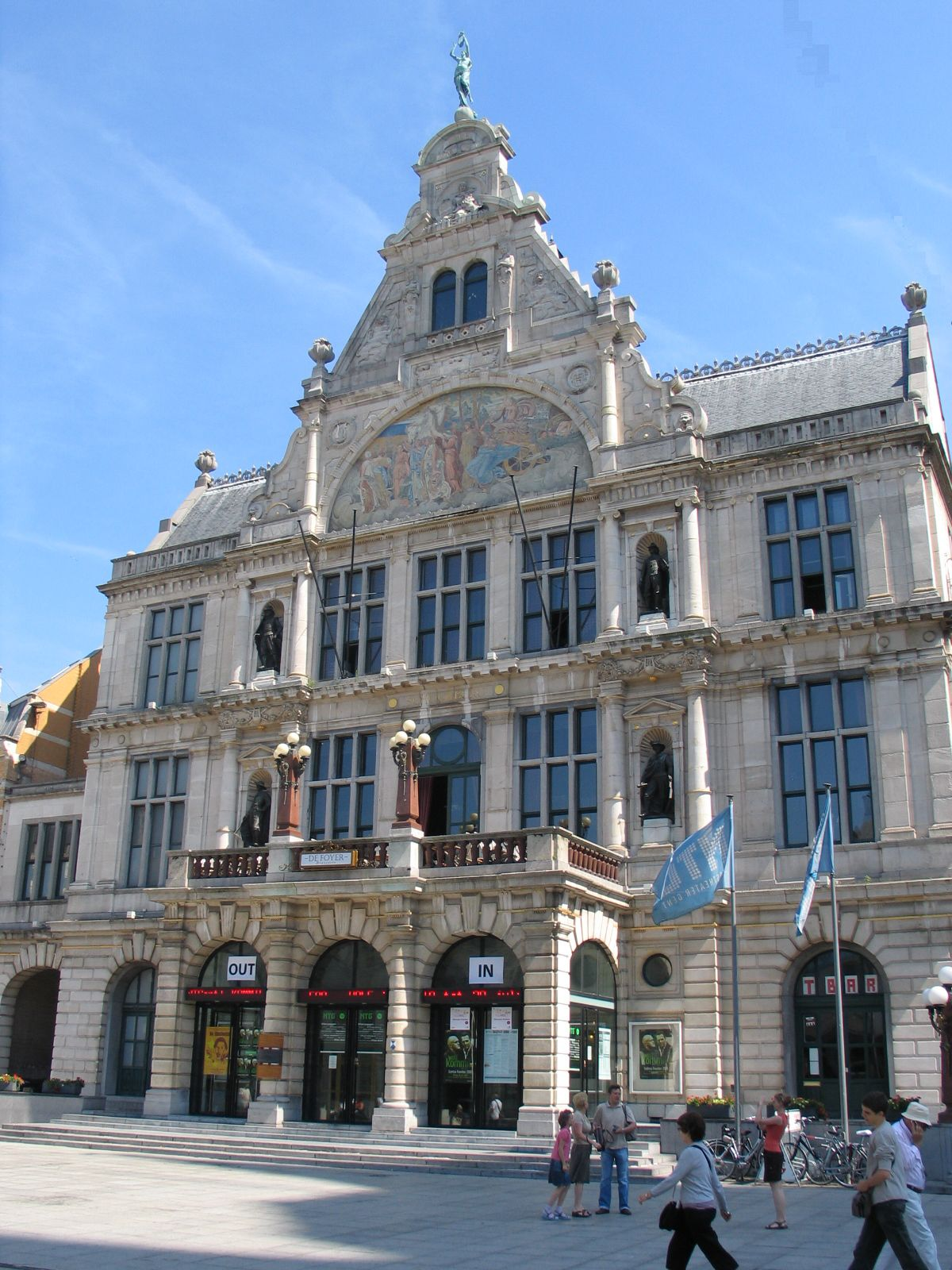
Royal Dutch Theatre (KNS)

On 28 October 1965, Nederlands Toneel Gent (Dutch Theatre of Ghent) was established as the city theatre of Ghent, a public institution, with its home at the Royal Dutch Theatre (KNS).

From 1979 to 1993, the KNS undertook an extensive refurbishment, which included the addition of a house on Biezekapelstraat. While the entrance and auditorium were undergoing renovations (1987–1993), NTGent had to find alternative venues for its performances.

Swiss-born director Milo Rau was appointed artistic director in 2018. Wanting to reshape the model of the European stadtstheater, believing that they are exclusive and elitist, and wanting to create "something more open" and better reflecting the multicultural nature of European cities today, Rau introduced his 10-point "Ghent Manifesto", in which he declared, among other stipulations:

- It's not just about portraying the world anymore. It's about changing it. The aim is not to depict the real, but to make the representation itself real.
- The literal adaptation of classics on stage is forbidden. If a source text – whether book, film or play – is used at the outset of the project, it may only represent up to 20 percent of the final performance time.
- At least two different languages must be spoken on stage in each production.
- At least one production per season must be rehearsed or performed in a conflict or war zone, without any cultural infrastructure.
- Each production must be shown in at least ten locations in at least three countries. No production can be removed from the NTGent repertoire before this number has been reached.

Rau stepped down from the role of artistic director in January 2023, although he continues to be involved with NTGent.

== Actors and collaborations ==
Until 2018, the company comprised a permanent ensemble of actors, which included Elsie de Brauw, Wim Opbrouck, Els Dottermans, Risto Kübar, and others. After the appointment of Rau as artistic director in 2018, the format changed to employing actors for a specific project only.

A series of theatrical pieces was created by Rau in 2018 under the title Histoire(s) du Théâtre. The title is a reference to Jean-Luc Godard's documentary film Histoire(s) du Cinéma, which recalled key moments in the history of European cinema. The first in the series was Rau's work La Reprise, which premiered at the Kunstenfestivaldesarts in Brussels in May 2018. Others in the series include Histoire(s) du Théâtre II (which included a re-enactment of a famous 1970s dance performance by the Congolese National Ballet), directed by Congolese choreographer Faustin Linyekula; Spanish director Angélica Liddell's In Liebestod - Histoire(s) du Théâtre III; Miet Warlop's Histoire(s) du Théâtre IV: One Song (2022); and English artist and writer Tim Etchells' Histoire(s) du Théâtre V: How Goes The World (2023–24).

In March 2023, the Belgian company Ontroerend Goed, headed by artistic director Alexander Devriendt, was appointed artists in residence at NTGent for five years.

Rau and his NTGent team travelled to the state of Pará in Brazil, where Amazonian forests are being destroyed and replaced by the cultivation of soy monoculture. In collaboration with the Movimento dos Trabalhadores Rurais Sem Terra (MST; "Landless Workers Movement"), they created Antigone in the Amazon, an allegorical play about the impact of the modern state and impact on traditional land rights, which causes huge displacements of people and devastation of culture. Scenes were filmed in Brazil, and the performance combines storytelling, music, film, and theatre, to illustrate its themes of political protest, state brutality, and heroism, based on Sophocles' play Antigone; a Greek tragedy transposed to a modern village in the Amazon. There is filmed re-enactment of the 1996 Eldorado do Carajás massacre, in which military police opened fire on a peaceful protest, killing 21 activists and injuring 69 others. The play premiered in May 2023, before going on tour in Europe. The play is performed in several languages, with English subtitles for its 2024 run at the Adelaide Festival in Adelaide, South Australia, in March 2024.

In December 2023, NTGent produced The Last Generation, or the 120 Days of Sodom, a reenactment of the Pier Paolo Pasolini's 1975 film performed by actors with Down syndrome in three languages, in collaboration with the Belgian ensemble Theater Stap, whose actors have learning disabilities.

As of 2024, NTGent's house artists are Milo Rau, Luanda Casella, and Lara Staal. Its artists in residence are: Ontroerend Goed, Miet Warlop & Irene Wool vzw, and Action Zoo Humain.

== Description ==
NTGent is subtitled "Het Stadtstheater van de Toekomst" (the City Theatre of the Future). It is subsidised by the Vlaamse Gemeenschap (Flemish Community) and the City of Ghent. There is a board of directors whose members are appointed by the subsidising authorities, and allowance is made for six co-opted members. Its best seats cost only around 28 euros.

As of 2024 the artistic co-directors are Yves Degryse, Barbara Raes, and Melih Gençboyacı, while Milo Rau is responsible for the 2023–2024 artistic programme.

Theatre patrons with visual or auditory disabilities, or those not fluent in Dutch are able to borrow a tablet to help them follow the performance, using a personalised app. Subtitles, audio description, and sign language are available on the app.

== Venues ==
As well as touring its productions, NTGent uses the 600-seat Royal Dutch Theatre (KNS) and 200-seat Minnemeers. NTGent also has partnerships with the VIERNULVIER and the Minardschouwburg.

The KNS, located in the city centre, was in 1899 established as a permanent location for the Nederlands Tooneel van Gent which had been established in 1871 and was performing in the Ghent Minardschouwburg ("the Minard"). After this company dissolved in 1945, the KNS was used by companies from Antwerp and Brussels. In 1965 NTGent took up residence at KNS.

The KNS underwent significant renovations between 1979 and 1993, and from October 2016, extensive modernisation and some internal reorganisation.

As of February 2024, NTGent manages two buildings owned by the City of Ghent, the KNS-Schouwburg and Minnemeers. There is an infrastructure plan to remedy some deficits of both buildings, which will undergo renovations during the year. Minnemeers will be transformed into a dual venue, with a black box theatre and a new hall. Its set studio will move to a new site outside the city, which will include rehearsal rooms.

== Notable performances ==
- 2018: Lam Gods (dir. Rau), which recreates Ghent's most famous artwork, known as Lam Gods, the 15th-century altarpiece by Hubert and Jan van Eyck and features local residents as its biblical figures, crusaders, and martyrs
- 2019: Histoire(s) du Theatre (I), recreating a notorious homophobic murder in Liège in 2012
- 2020: Familie, about a family who all commit suicide
- May 2023: Antigone in the Amazon
- December 2023: The Last Generation, or the 120 Days of Sodom
- January 2024: Elektra Unbound, a co-production with deSingel and HAU Berlin, starring NTGent's Luanda Casella

== Artistic directors ==
The artistic directors to date have been:

- 1965: Dré Poppe
- 1967: Albert Hanssens
- 1972: Walter Eysselynck
- 1976: Jacques Van Schoor
- 1977: Jef Demedts
- 1991: Hugo Van Den Berghe
- 1997: Jean-Pierre De Decker
- 2000: Martine Gos, Alain Pringels, Mathias Sercu, Domien Van Der Meiren
- 2005: Johan Simons
- 2010: Wim Opbrouck
- 2015: Johan Simons
- 2018: Milo Rau
- 2023: Barbara Raes, Melih Gençboyacı en Yves Degryse
