= Frie Leysen =

Belgian festival director (1950–2020)

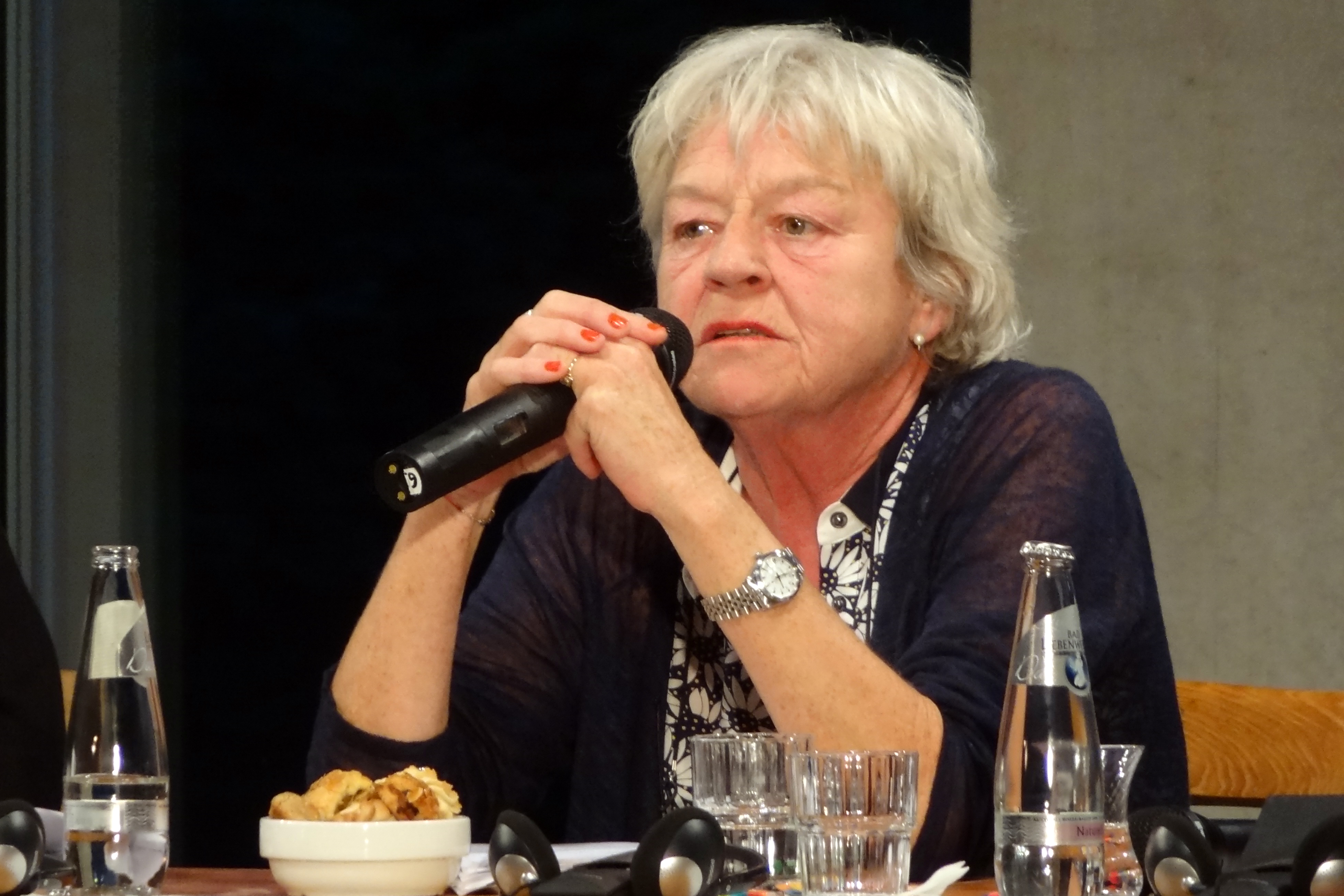
- Frie Leysen (2012)
- Born: 19 February 1950; Hasselt, Belgium
- Died: 22 September 2020 (aged 70)
- Occupation: Festival director

Frie Leysen (19 February 1950 – 22 September 2020) was a Belgian festival director. She was director of the art centre deSingel, Antwerp, from 1980 until 1991. In 1994, she co-founded the Kunstenfestivaldesarts in Brussels.

== Early life and education ==
Frie Leysen was born in Hasselt on 19 February 1950 as the daughter of Bert Leysen, the first programming director of the NIR, and the twin sister of actor Johan Leysen. She studied Medieval Art History at the University of Leuven.

== Career ==
Leysen was the first director of art centre deSingel in Antwerp, from 1980 to 1991.

Together with Guido Minne she founded the Kunstenfestivaldesarts in Brussels in 1994. The first edition of the festival took place in May 1994. Under her direction the festival became an internationally-acclaimed major event for Belgian and international performing artists.

In 2007 she organised Meeting Points 5, a multidisciplinary festival taking place in nine different Arabic cities (Amman, Damascus, Beirut, Ramallah, Cairo, Alexandria, El Minia, Tunis, and Rabat), as well as in Brussels and Berlin.

She curated the Theater der Welt in 2010, was an artistic director at Berliner Festspiele in 2010-12, and was the artistic director of the Wiener Festwochen in 2013–14.

She curated the performing arts program of Homeworks 7 in Beirut in 2015.

== Death ==
After a period of illness, Leysen died on 22 September 2020 aged 70.

== Awards ==
- 1991: Arkprijs van het Vrije Woord (Ark Prize of Free Speech)
- 2003: Flemish Community Award for general cultural contributions
- 2014: Honorary doctorate from the Free University of Brussels
- 2014: Erasmus Prize
- 2018: Co-recipient of the Bernadette Abraté Award, given by the French-speaking theatre critics in Brussels, with Christophe Slagmuylder, for their work at the Kunstenfestivaldesarts
- 2019: European Festivals Association (EFFE) lifetime achievement award, to acknowledge her commitment to artists and her actions for artists' creative freedom
