= Five Easy Pieces (Milo Rau) =

Five Easy Pieces (2016) is a theatre production that the Swiss theatre and film director Milo Rau made with children for the Ghent arts centre CAMPO and that is based on the Dutroux affair.

== The Dutroux affair as a starting point ==
As with other theatre productions by Milo Rau, testimonies and reconstructions of true facts form the basis of Five Easy Pieces. In this case they relate to the life and the crimes of Marc Dutroux, who kidnapped, raped and murdered with the help of some accomplices a series of children in the 90s in Belgium. Milo Rau says that he is always looking for the traumatic, tragic moments in the lives of both individuals and a country, because we are most affected and changed in those moments.

However, Milo Rau's intention was not to create an accurate representation of the Dutroux affair with Five Easy Pieces, but a modern tragedy with Dutroux as the starting point. His intention was to make "a children's theatre performance that was risky, unprecedented and virtually impossible." With the life and the crimes of Marc Dutroux as a starting point he searches in Five Easy Pieces for the limits of "what children know, feel and do", and explores what is acceptable and unacceptable for the spectators.

== Underlying themes ==
The essence of Five Easy Pieces is not the horror of the Dutroux affair, but the big themes that lie behind this specific case. According to Milo Rau, these are "the decline of a country, the national paranoia, the mourning, and the anger that followed the crimes." It is not the killer and his psyche that interest him, but the history of Belgium and the collapse of Western colonial and industrial powers. In the Dutroux affair a number of important historical events concerning Belgium converge: from the loss of the Congo colony to the closure of the coal mines. In the theatre production Marc Dutroux functions as a kind of collective symbol for Belgium, as a black hole.

With Five Easy Pieces Milo Rau fictionalizes the Dutroux affair with the aim of telling something that exceeds the case. According to his own word, Marc Dutroux is a pretext for him to talk "about a government that does not function and about to what extent people have been disconnected from the political system." The Dutroux affair serves as an allegory about how we experience the world and think about it, and about how we deal with the emotional shock and pain caused by an extremely upsetting experience.

== Metatheatre (Theatre about theatre) ==
Milo Rau's Five Easy Pieces is also a reflection on theatre. The title Five Easy Pieces refers to a series of exercises that Igor Stravinsky composed in 1917 in order to teach children how to play the piano, and that were also called Five Easy Pieces. The theatre production of Milo Rau is made up of five monologues, each offering a different perspective on how children learn to act and how they learn to grow up. Milo Rau sees his performances as Lehrstücke, in the Brechtian tradition: his actors learn to play.

Every scene of Milo Rau's Five Easy Pieces starts with the projection of a short film in which adults start the scene. The children then take up live, act the scene simultaneously on the theatre stage, and continue playing while the only adult actor - in the role of director - films and encourages them. In this way the children play the role of the old and sick father of Dutroux, a police agent who discovers the murdered children, one of his victims and the parents of one of his other victims. What Milo Rau was interested in was to show the audience that a director, just like Marc Dutroux, is always a manipulator to a certain extent and that there exists a power game between him and his actors (especially if they are children).

== Artistic team ==
Milo Rau is responsible for the concept, text and direction of Five Easy Pieces. The actors on stage are Rachel Dedain, Aimone De Zordo, Fons Dumont, Arno John Keys, Maurice Leerman, Pepijn Loobuyck, Willem Loobuyck, Blanche Ghyssaert, Polly Persyn, Lucia Redondo, Peter Seynaeve, Pepijn Siddiki, Elle Liza Tayou, Winne Vanacker, Hendrik Van Doorn and Eva Luna Van Hijfte. However, they form two different casts of seven children and one adult. Peter Seynaeve also takes on the role of directing assistant and performance coach. The actors in the film material are Sara De Bosschere, Pieter-Jan De Wyngaert, Johan Leysen, Peter Seynaeve, Jan Steen, Ans Van den Eede, Hendrik Van Doorn and Annabelle Van Nieuwenhuyse. Stefan Bläske is the dramatic advisor.

Five Easy Pieces (Milo Rau, 2016) is a production of the Ghent arts centre CAMPO and the International Institute of Political Murder (IIPM), the theatre and film production company of Milo Rau. Co-producers are the Kunstenfestivaldesarts (Brussels), Münchner Kammerspiele, La Bâtie - Festival de Genève, Kaserne Basel, Gessnerallee Zürich, Singapore International Festival of Arts (SIFA), SICK! Festival (Manchester), Sophiensaele Berlin and Le phénix scene national Valenciennes pôle européen de création.

== Performances ==
Five Easy Pieces premiered on 14 May 2016 at the Kunstenfestivaldesarts in Brussels. An extensive tour in Belgium and abroad followed afterwards, from 2016 until 2018. In Belgium, the production was performed in Aalst, Brussels, Charleroi, Genk, Ghent, Mons, Namur, Ostend, Roeselare, Turnhout, Waregem and Zaventem. In the Netherlands performances took place in Amsterdam, 's-Hertogenbosch, Rotterdam and Utrecht. In addition, the production travelled around the world with an extensive series of performances in Argentina, Australia, Bosnia and Herzegovina, Germany, Hungary, France, Italy, Norway, Poland, Portugal, Singapore, Slovenia, Spain, Switzerland, Brazil, the United States and Japan.

== Reception in press ==
Five Easy Pieces received wide critical acclaim in the press. Based on a poll among about fifty critics, the German specialist journal Theater Heute proclaimed Five easy pieces as best production of the year. Theatre critic Tuur Devens wrote in the Dutch theatre magazine Theaterkrant: "But let Dutroux play by children?! Children who play casual and innocent, you can not let them bring such horror? Milo Rau does it, and in his way in a splendid way: the subject matter of Five Easy Pieces is the Dutroux affair, but at the same time it is about playing, about manipulation and abuse of power in the world, outside and in theatre." In the Dutch newspaper NRC culture editor Herien Wensink wrote: "You could blame director Milo Rau - public impact is guaranteed - but the execution is subdued and integer, the result powerful and disruptive." Journalist Magali Degrande wrote in the Belgian newspaper Het Nieuwsblad: "Five Easy Pieces makes you shiver and smile, a nacre pickaxe that reveals hidden basements and rolls flat over them. Irresponsibly good theater."

Yet there were also some critical reactions, especially from Jean Lambrecks, the father of one of the victims of Dutroux. He was disappointed because Milo Rau's production is insufficiently a factual representation of the Dutroux affair.

== Festival selections ==
In 2017 Five Easy Pieces was selected for the Theater Festival in both the Netherlands and Flanders. Together with Risjaar Drei (Olympique Dramatique and Toneelhuis, 2017), it was the only production that was selected for both festivals, which present the most interesting performances of the past season. In its report the jury of the Flanders Theatre Festival wrote: "Its wry humour and its political-social commitment make 'Five Easy Pieces' one of the most captivating theatre experiences of the past season, which the jury voted for as one block". In 2017 the production was also selected for the German Theatertreffen festival, which shows the ten most notable productions of the past season. Furthermore, the play was presented at the Schauspiel Köln as part of the Impulse Festival in 2017 (30 June and 1 July). On both dates German and English subtitles were provided and a discussion with Milo Rau and the cast that was open to questions from the audience followed after a short break on the prior date. There it was also addressed that one scene that features a young, fully naked girl was not allowed to be performed as part of the festival. After some back and forth one had agreed to exchange the live scene with a video recording of it. In advance German newspapers already announced this play as one of the festival highlights whilst dropping Milo Rau's name.

== Awards ==
In October 2016 Milo Rau received the Special Prize of the Jury 2016 for Five Easy Pieces from the Belgian Prix de la Critique Théâtre et Danse. The jury report stated: "This is not a performance, but a flagellation. [...] This is all the brave, reckless genius of Milo Rau, who never curbs the candour of the young actors but slips in powerful metaphors."

Afterwards, a series of prizes followed outside of Belgium. At the Theatertreffen festival in Berlin in May 2017, Milo Rau was awarded the 3sat prize for the production. The jury praised the director for his trendsetting and artistic-innovative work. The jury report stated: "Rau does not make the monstrous bearable, but he makes it narrative, and asks fundamental questions about violence between minors and adults. In this way, 'Five Easy Pieces' celebrates what the Dutrouxs of this world want to destroy: childlike wisdom, childlike will and childlike pride." The German-speaking theatre magazine Theater Heute awarded the production with both the best production prize in 2017 and the prize for the best dramaturgy in 2017. At the MESS festival in Sarajevo in October 2017, Five Easy Pieces received four prizes: the Grand Prix – Golden Laurel Wreath for Best Performance, the Golden Laurel Wreath for Best Director, the Audience Award for Best Performance and the MESS Critics Award. A couple of months later, in December 2017, the production received the Premio Ubu 2017 for the best foreign show in Italy.
