= Jefta van Dinther =

Dutch-Swedish choreographer and dancer

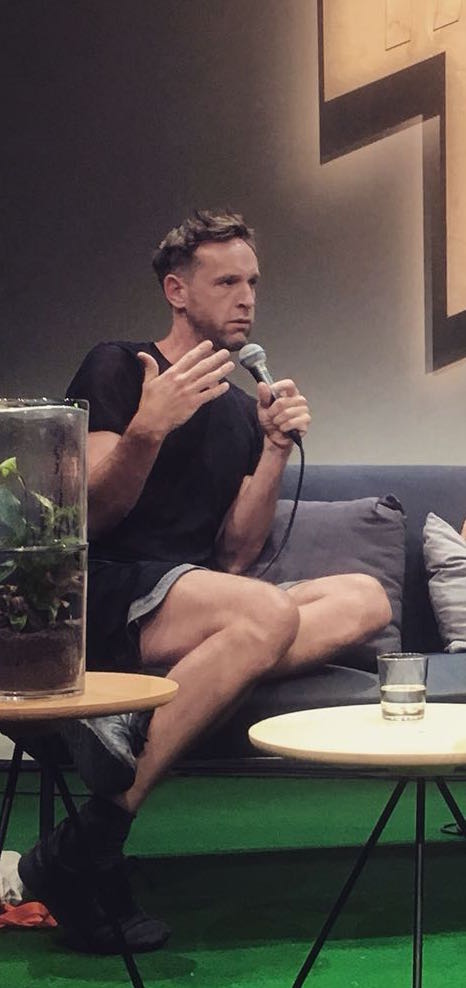
- Jefta van Dinther at Tanz im August (2017)
- Born: 4 March 1980; Utrecht, Netherlands
- Occupations: choreographer, dancer
- Website: official website

Jefta van Dinther (born 4 March 1980 in Utrecht) is a Dutch-Swedish choreographer and dancer. Today van Dinther lives and works in Berlin and Stockholm.

== Life and achievements ==
Van Dinther grew up in the Netherlands and Sweden. From 1999 to 2003 he attended Amsterdam School of the Arts, where he studied modern and contemporary Dance. He worked as a dancer with various choreographers, including Mette Ingvartsen, Xavier Le Roy and Ivana Müller. Since 2008 he has been creating his own performances as a choreographer.

Van Dinther's performances are regularly presented at international venues, such as at Volksbühne, HAU Hebbel am Ufer, Komische Oper Berlin, Sadler's Wells in London, Tanzquartier in Vienna, Internationaal Theater Amsterdam, Centre Georges Pompidou and Théâtre national de Chaillot in Paris, as well as at the festivals Tanz im August in Berlin, Festival TransAmériques in Montreal and at ImPulsTanz in Vienna.

In addition to producing his own pieces, van Dinther teaches choreography at various institutions, including Stockholm University of the Arts, where he was appointed senior lecturer and artistic director of the master program in choreography between 2012 and 2014.

Many of his performances are created in collaboration with lighting designer Minna Tiikkainen and sound designer David Kiers, with whom van Dinther has worked for many years. Most of van Dinther's performances are produced by himself, but his work has also been commissioned by the Swedish Cullberg Ballet (Plateau Effect in 2013 and Protagonist in 2016). In 2019 van Dinther remounted Plateau Effect from 2013 for Berlin State Ballet and it was included into their repertory in Komische Oper Berlin. Between 2019/20 and 2021/22 van Dinther is an associated artist at the company Cullberg.

== Works (selection) ==
- 2008: It's in the Air, collaboration with Mette Ingvartsen
- 2009: The Way Things Go
- 2010: Kneeding
- 2011: The Blanket Dance, collaboration with choreographers Frederic Gies and DD Dorvillier
- 2011: Grind, collaboration with lighting designer Minna Tiikkainen and sound designer David Kiers
- 2012: This is Concrete, collaboration with choreographer Thiago Granato
- 2013: Plateau Effect (for the Swedish Cullberg Ballet)
- 2014: As It Empties Out
- 2014: Monument, choreography for the music video by Röyksopp & Robyn
- 2016: Protagonist (for the Swedish Cullberg Ballet)
- 2017: Dark Field Analysis
- 2019: The Quiet
- 2019: Plateau Effect for Berlin State Ballet
- 2022: On Earth I'm Done: Mountains
- 2022: Unearth
- 2022: On Earth I'm Done: Islands
- 2024: Remachine

== Awards (selection) ==
- 2012: Birgit Cullberg Grant
- 2012: The Wild Card and Prize of the Youth Jury at Theaterfestival Favoriten, Dortmund
- 2013: Swedish Theater Critics Dance Prize for Plateau Effect

== Literature ==
- Brandstetter, Gabriele. Synchronisierungen von Bewegungen im zeitgenössischen Tanz: Zur Relevanz von somatischen Praktiken in den Arbeiten von Jefta van Dinther. In Breyer, Thiemo et al. (eds.). Resonanz – Rhythmus – Synchronisierung. Interaktionen in Alltag, Therapie und Kunst. Bielefeld: Transcript Verlag, 2017, p. 409–428. ISBN 978-3-8376-3544-7.
- Cvejić, Bojana. Choreographing Problems: Expressive Concepts in European Contemporary Dance and Performance. London: Palgrave Macmillan, 2015. ISBN 978-1-137-43739-6. online
