= DeSingel =

Arts center in Antwerp, Belgium

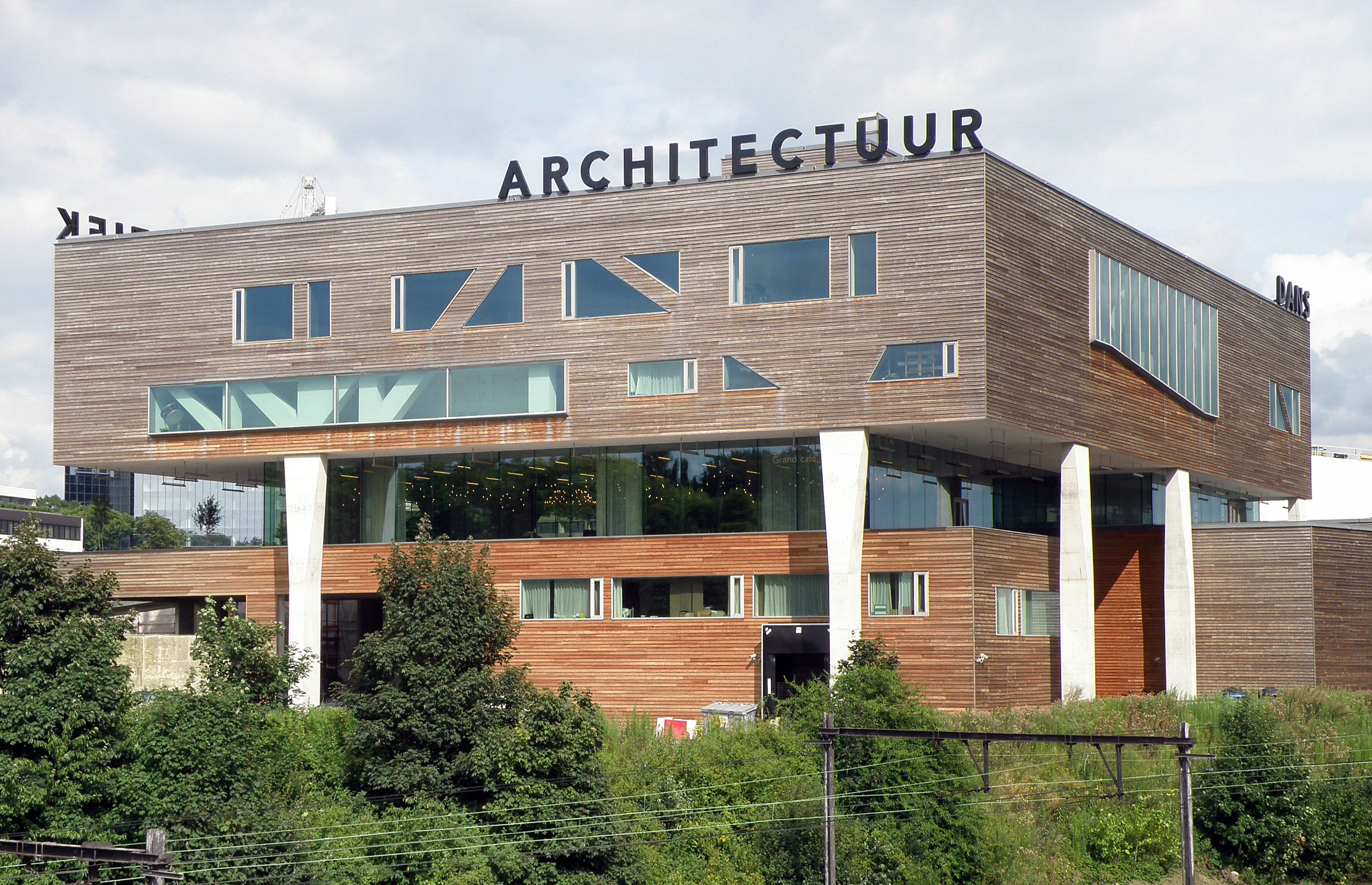
- Country: Belgium
- Coordinates: 51°11′41″N 4°24′12″E
- Directors: Hendrik Storme

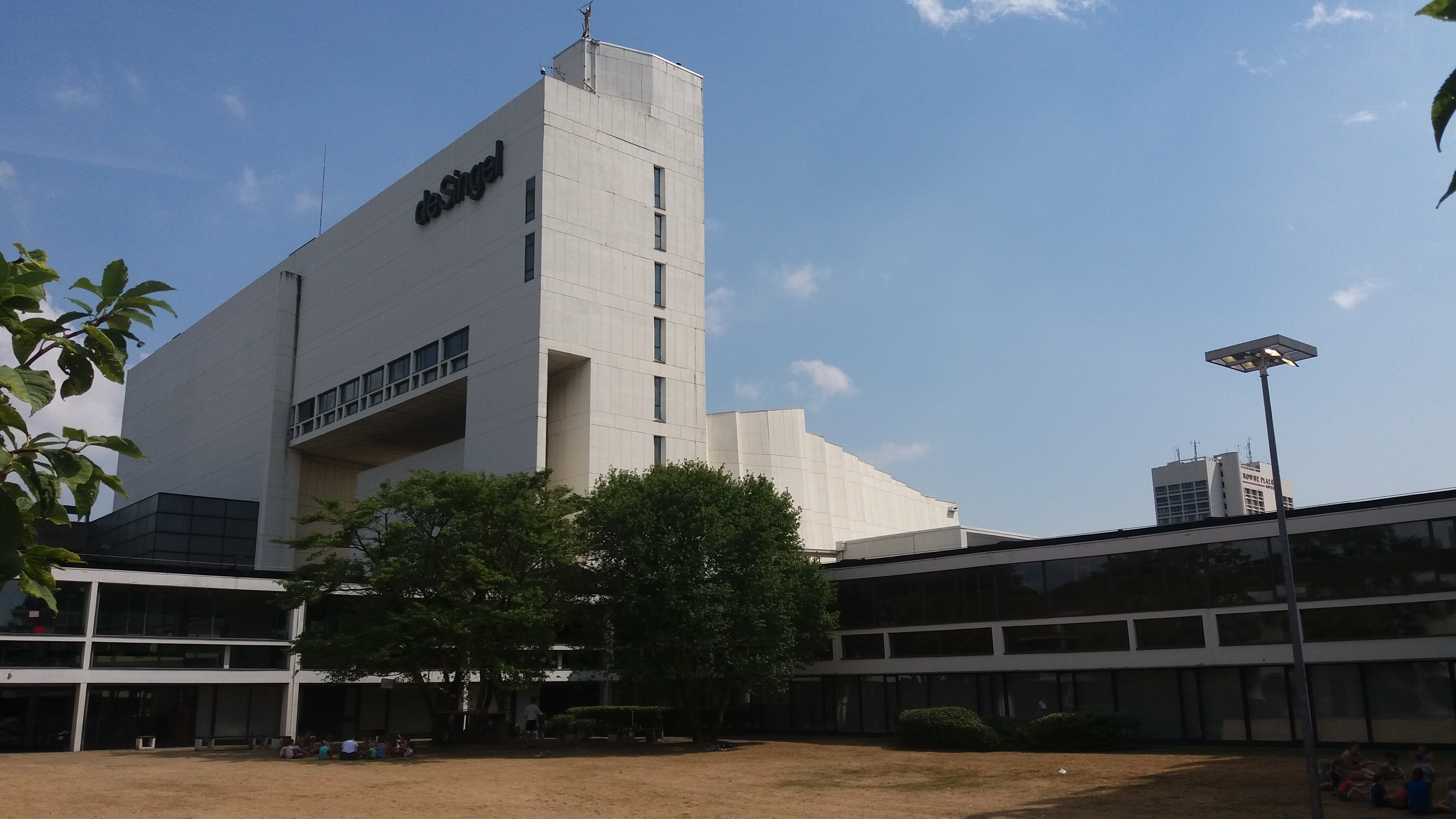
deSingel in Antwerp

deSingel is a Belgian arts center. It is located on the Desguinlei in Antwerp. Its various stages, concert halls and exhibition spaces offer a manifold program of music, dance, theater and architecture. It is also home to the Royal Conservatory of Antwerp, the Flemish Architecture Institute (VAI), the Study Center for Flemish Music (SVM), the VDAB employment initiative for theatre technicians Sabbattini, the Eastman dance company, ChampdAction, I Solisti, detheatermaker and the Spiegel String Quartet.

== History ==
In 1867 composer Peter Benoit was the director of the Flemish Music Conservatory in Antwerp. It was his dream to expand the school with a large concert and theatre hall, in order to involve the students of his school, as well as the general public, with what the international music and theater scenes had to offer. Fifteen years later the idea was approved by the Antwerp city council and plans for a new building were drawn up in 1883. However, it would take 80 more years for the new arts centre to open its doors.

In 1958, by now composer Flor Peeters was general manager, the Ministry of Public Works commissioned architect Léon Stynen to design a complex of buildings. 1964 saw the symbolic laying of the cornerstone. In 1968 the new music conservatory opened: an 8-shaped pavilion, with classrooms overlooking two gardens. The second phase of the construction - the concert hall, theater and library - was suspended due to a lack of funding.

In 1973 the governor of Antwerp, Andries Kinsbergen, proposed to include the public radio channel in the complex and the project was resumed. Construction of phase 2 began in 1979. The music conservatory was expanded with a section for Radio 2 Antwerp, and two large halls and a library tower were added.

The size and potential of the new infrastructure far exceeded the needs of the music conservatory. New manager Eugène Traey (former chairman of the Queen Elisabeth Competition) hired Frie Leysen on December 1, 1979, to help prepare for the opening. On November 4, 1980, the Cultural Center deSingel was officially opened, in the presence of King Baudouin and Queen Fabiola.

Poster for “The Old Woman” by Robert Wilson, starring Willem Dafoe and Mikhail Baryshnikov, in deSingel

In 1980 Frie Leysen became manager of deSingel. She instigated its development into an arts center with a unique vision and a strong international reputation. The Red Hall serves mainly for theater and dance performances. It regularly welcomes new productions by artists like Romeo Castellucci, Anne Teresa De Keersmaeker and her Rosas company, Sidi Larbi Cherkaoui and his Eastman company, Robert Wilson, Ivo van Hove and Toneelgroep Amsterdam and other national and international theatre and dance companies. The Blue Hall is used mainly for classical music concerts and sees recurrent visits by conductor Philippe Herreweghe and Collegium Vocale Gent, pianist András Schiff and his Building Bridges project for young pianists, big international orchestras or small chamber music concerto's.

In 1987 the building was expanded once again. Architect Stynen added extra space for the music conservatory and a small public foyer for deSingel. Young architect Stéphane Beel designed the doors that separate the corridors and halls from the entrance hall, which allows for ticket control. Within those doors he echoed the ‘potato’ shape of the oval windows that typify the designs of Stynen. In 1990 Beel curated a retrospective exhibition of Léon Stynen's design, underlining his affection for the deSingel-building.

In 1995, Beel was commissioned to draw up a master plan to reorganize and expand deSingel and the music conservatory. Phase one of the master plan was realized in 2000. The stage in the Red Hall was enlarged, artists' lounges were added and the artists' foyer was extended and windows were added to let the daylight in. In 2002 Minister for Culture Bert Anciaux commissioned Beel to realize the second phase of the project and to also incorporate parts of the graduate school of Antwerp, which is now called Artesis. The project was started in 2007 and completed in 2010.

In 2005 deSingel was recognized as one of the seven official art institutions of the Flemish Community.

The technological part of the theatre tower was renovated in 2017, which included a new rigging system. deSingel now has two large, well-equipped stages. The Blue Hall can accommodate 940 melomaniacs, while the Red Hall has a capacity of 803 seats. This second hall was thoroughly renovated in 2019. The new wing also includes the Theater Studio, with 288 seats, and the Music Studio, with 150 seats, where smaller-scale performances take place. There is also an exhibition space which measures 400m² and a restaurant on the premises.

In September 2020 Hendrik Storme became the new general and artistic director of deSingel. He succeeded Jerry Aerts, who retired after 19 years as general and artistic director.
