= Faustin Linyekula =

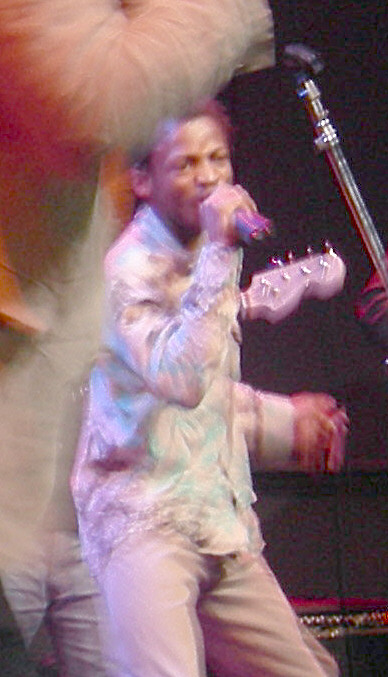
Faustin Linyekula onstage with Wawile Bonane and his soukous band as part of the 2007 Seattle performance Linyekula's Festival of Lies

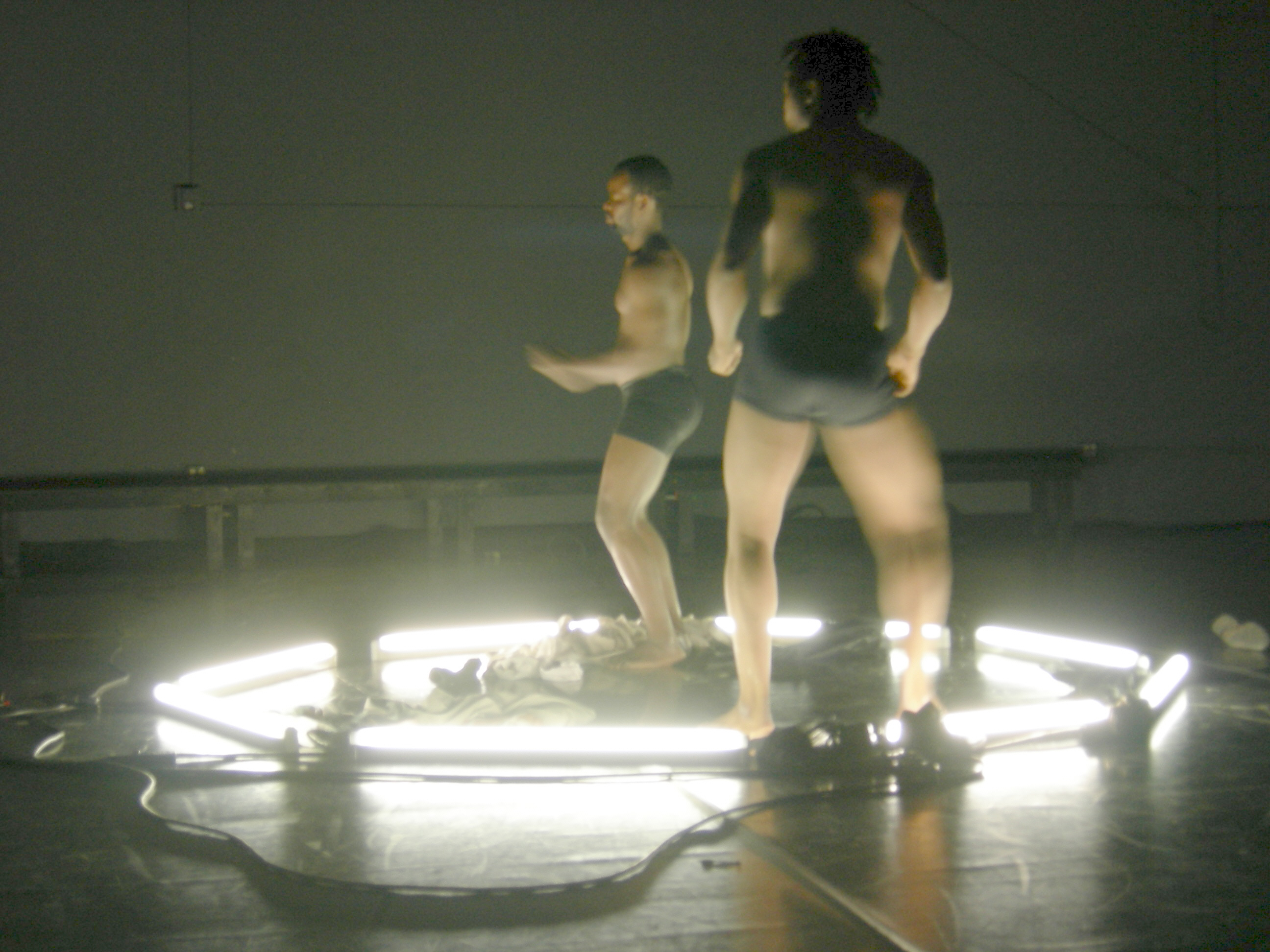
Dancers, Festival of Lies, 2007

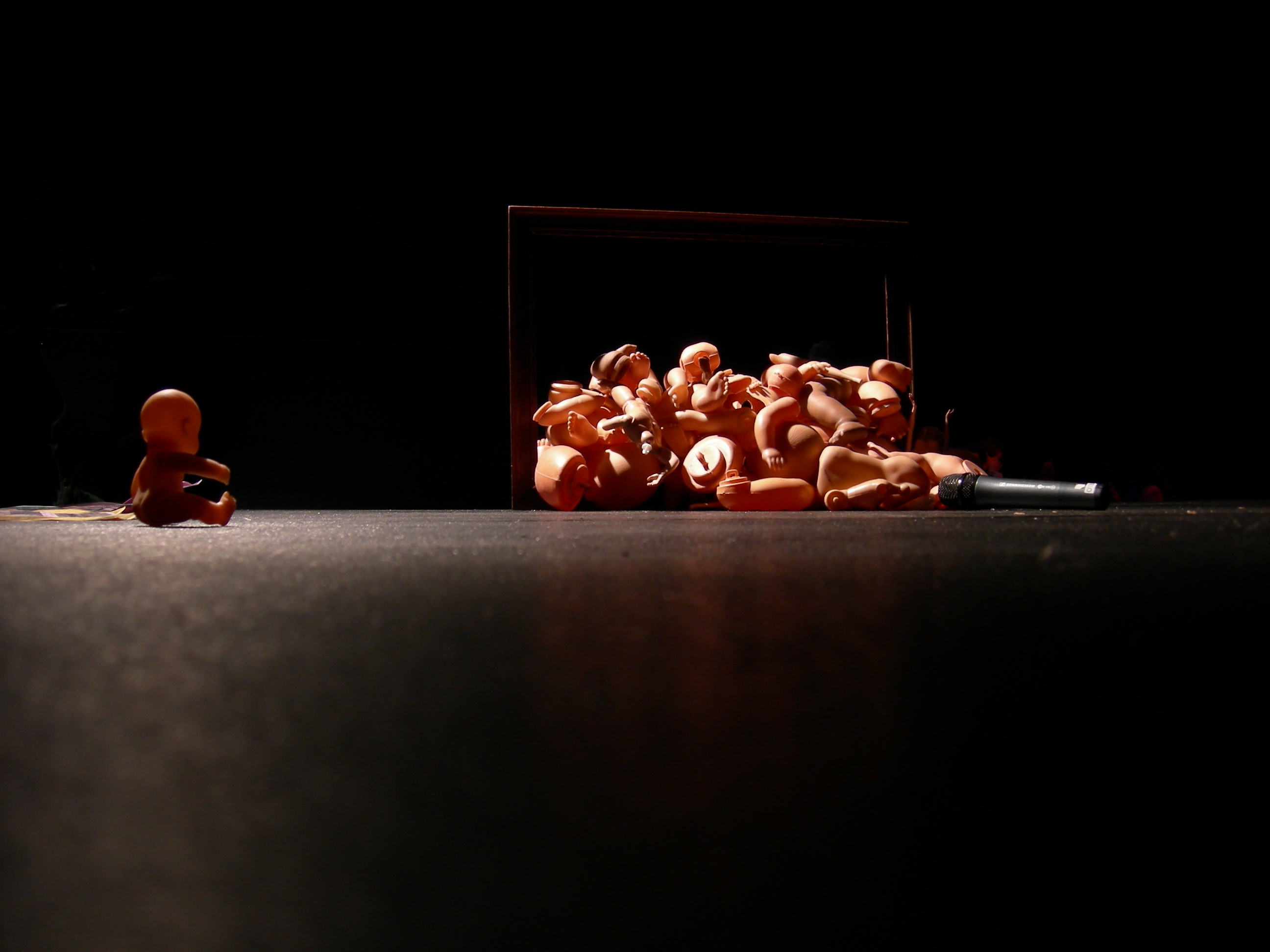
Broken dolls representing casualties of war, Festival of Lies, 2007

Faustin Linyekula (born February 27, 1974) is a Congolese dancer and choreographer of contemporary dance.

== Early life and education ==
Linyekula was born on born February 27, 1974 in Ubundu, Zaire, now Democratic Republic of Congo. He was raised in a "multilingual, multicultural" environment, in a Roman Catholic family. Because of the state ideology of the Mobutu Sese Seko regime, the European name, Faustin, could not appear on any legal documents.

According to Toba Singer, Linyekula studied literature and theater in Kisangani (in northeast Zaire, his native region). The universities in Zaire were soon shut down; he went to Nairobi, Kenya.

== Career ==
Linyekula is a dancer and choreographer of contemporary dance.

In 1997 Linyekula co-founded the Gàara company with mime Opiyo Okach and dancer Afrah Tenambergen, the first contemporary dance company in Kenya and his first experience as a choreographer. He then traveled to France, where he took up a residency first with choreographer Régine Chopinot and then with Mathilde Monnier, and to the Tanzwochen Festival in Vienna, Austria where he and South African dancer Gregory Maqoma created Tales off the Mud Wall (2000).

Returning to the Congo, in June 2001 in Kinshasa he established the Studios Kabako, a structure form multidisciplinary creation and performance; Brenda Dixon Gottschild, professor emerita of Dance Studies at Temple University characterizes this as choosing "the path of most resistance," given his opportunities in Europe.

In 2003, he choreographed a piece for six hip-hop dancers as part of the Suresnes Cités Danse Festival. The French Centre National de la Danse gave him carte blanche to create a festival in 2005; the result was Le Cargo, in which appear ten African companies mostly presenting their work for the first time in Europe. In 2007, his Festival des mensonges ("Festival of Lies") was presented at the Festival d'Avignon, as well as Dinozord: The Dialogue Series (2006).

″Le Cargo″, his first solo (2011) is still touring in Europe (Vienna, Paris, Grenoble, Brussels, Ostende, Genk, Athens, Geneva, Salzburg, Umea, Gdansk, Lisbon...), Africa (Tunis, Johannesburg, Kinshasa, Lubumbashi, Nouakchott, Dakar, Ouagadougou, Lusaka, Yaoundé, Douala, Niamey, Zinder, Djibouti, Kampala, Accra, Bata...), North America (New York, Portland, Minneapolis, Burlington - Vermont, Ottawa and Vancouver), Australia (Brisbane) and New Caledonia (Nouméa). A piece for 4 dancers and 3 performers, Drums and Digging (2013) premiered at the Avignon festival in 2013 and toured in 2014 in France (Paris, Grenoble, Annecy) and Belgium (Leuven, Brussels, Ghent).

Other collaborations include ″La Création du Monde 1923-2012″, a piece for 24 dancers of the Ballet de Lorraine in Nancy and Djodjo Kazadi (2012) and ″Sans-titre″ (2009), a duet written by German director Raimund Hoghe.

Linyekula has taught in Africa, Europe (Parts / Brussels, CNDC Angers / France, Impulstanz / Vienna) and in the United States (Florida University Gainesville, University of the Arts Philadelphia...) and has been part of a think tank with other African artists and intellectuals around the creation of an arts center near Cape Town. The think tank resulted in the creation of the Africa Centre.

Since 2006, he is based in Kisangani. The Studios Kabako are accompanying there local and national artistic initiatives in the field of dance, theatre, music and video, from training to production and touring. Young accompanied artists include among others Dinozord, Papy Ebotany, Djino Alolo, Dorine Mokha, Jeannot Kumbonyeki, Yves Mwamba.... (dance), Flamme Kapaya, Pasnas, Franck Moka, Huguette Tolinga (music), Michael Disanka & Christiana Tabaro (theatre). In May 2009 opened the first professional recording studio of the eastern part of the country. At the initiative of Pamoja project, a residency and production programme, the Studios Kabako have also host and coproduced many artists from Africa, including projects from South Africa, Nigeria, Senegal, Mozambique, and Burkina Faso.

Linyekula toured "Not Another Diva...", a musical theatre piece cosigned with South African performer Hlengiwe Lushaba. In 2019 "Congo", adapted from Eric Vuillard's book, premiered.

Histoire(s) du Théâtre II was a 2019 a commission from Milo Rau /NTGent, which included a re-enactment of a famous 1970s dance performance by the Congolese National Ballet.

== Practice and themes ==
Linyekula's works are structured along the lines of the dance form ndombolo and its associated music and address "the legacy of decades of war, terror, fear and the collapse of the economy for himself, his family and his friends."

== Recognition and awards ==
Linyekula is the winner of the 2007 Principal Prince Claus Award.

In 2014, he received the Principle Award of the CurryStone Prize for the work developed in Kisangani.

He was one of the guest artists of the Re-Place-Ing Philadelphia project initiated in 2015 by the Painted Bride Art Centre.

In 2016, he was associate artist to the city of Lisbon in Portugal, as part of the Artista Na Cidade] Biennale.

In 2019, he was, jointly with William Kentridge, associate artist to the Holland Festival.

From September 2018 for three years, he was associate artist to the Manège in Reims (France).

== Principal choreographic works ==
=== With Studios Kabako ===
- Spectacularly Empty I (2001)
- Triptyque sans titre – Fragments et Autres Boues Recyclés ("Untitled Triptych - Fragments and Other Recycled Sludge" 2002)
- Spectacularly Empty II (2003)
- Radio Okapi (2004)
- Le Festival des mensonges ("Festival of Lies", 2005–2006)
- The Dialogue Series: i. Franco (2006)
- The Dialogue Series: iii. Dinozord (2006)
- La Fratrie errante (2007)
- more more more... future (2009)
- Pour en finir avec Bérénice (2010)
- Le Cargo (2011)
- Sur les traces de Dinozord (2012)
- What is Black Music Anyway / Self-Portrait (2012), a performance for the MOMA in New York
- Drums and Digging (2013)
- The Dialogue Series: IV Moya (2014)
- Statue of Loss (2014)
- The Kin-Philly Connection (2015), a performance for the Fondation Cartier in Paris
- Banataba (2017), a Metropolitanlivearts production, with Moya Michael
- Not Another Diva... (2018), a music/theater piece by Faustin Linyekula and Hlengiwe Lushaba

=== Others ===
- Cleansing (1997, with Opiyo Okach, Afrah Tenambergen and la Compagnie Gàara)
- Tales off the Mud Wall (2000, with Gregory Vuyani Maqoma)
- Telle une ombre gravée dans la poussière ("Such a Shadow Etched in the Dust", 2003)
- Mes obsessions: j’y pense et puis je crie! ("My obsessions: I think and then I scream!", 2006)
- Si c'est un nègre / autoportrait ("If that is a Black Man / Self Portrait", (2003), a solo for French dancer Sylvain Prunenec
- Bérénice (2009) by Jean Racine, a commission by the Comédie française in Paris
- La création du monde 1923-2012 (2012) for the Ballet de Lorraine, Nancy
