= Milo Rau =

Swiss theatre director

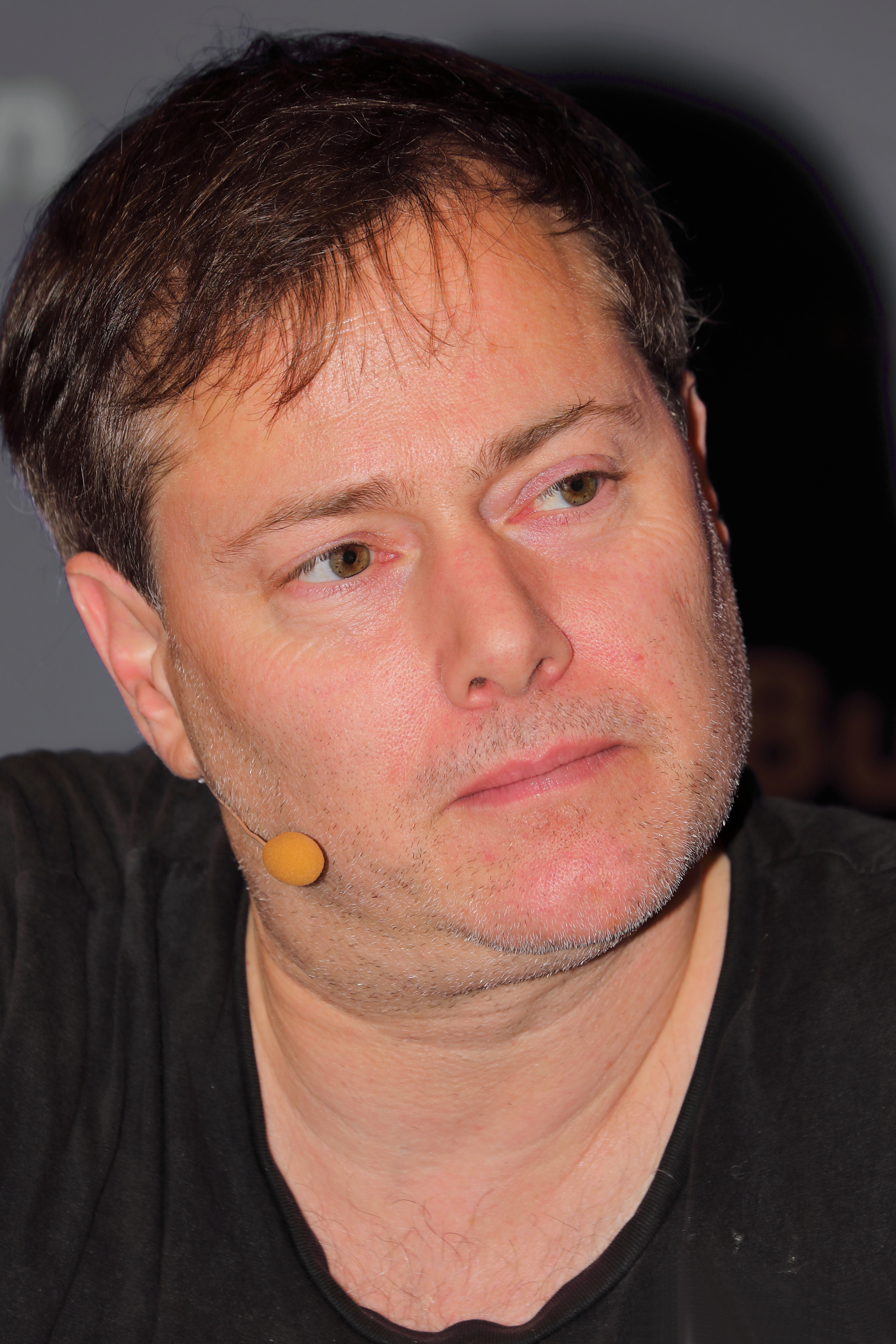
Milo Rau (2023)

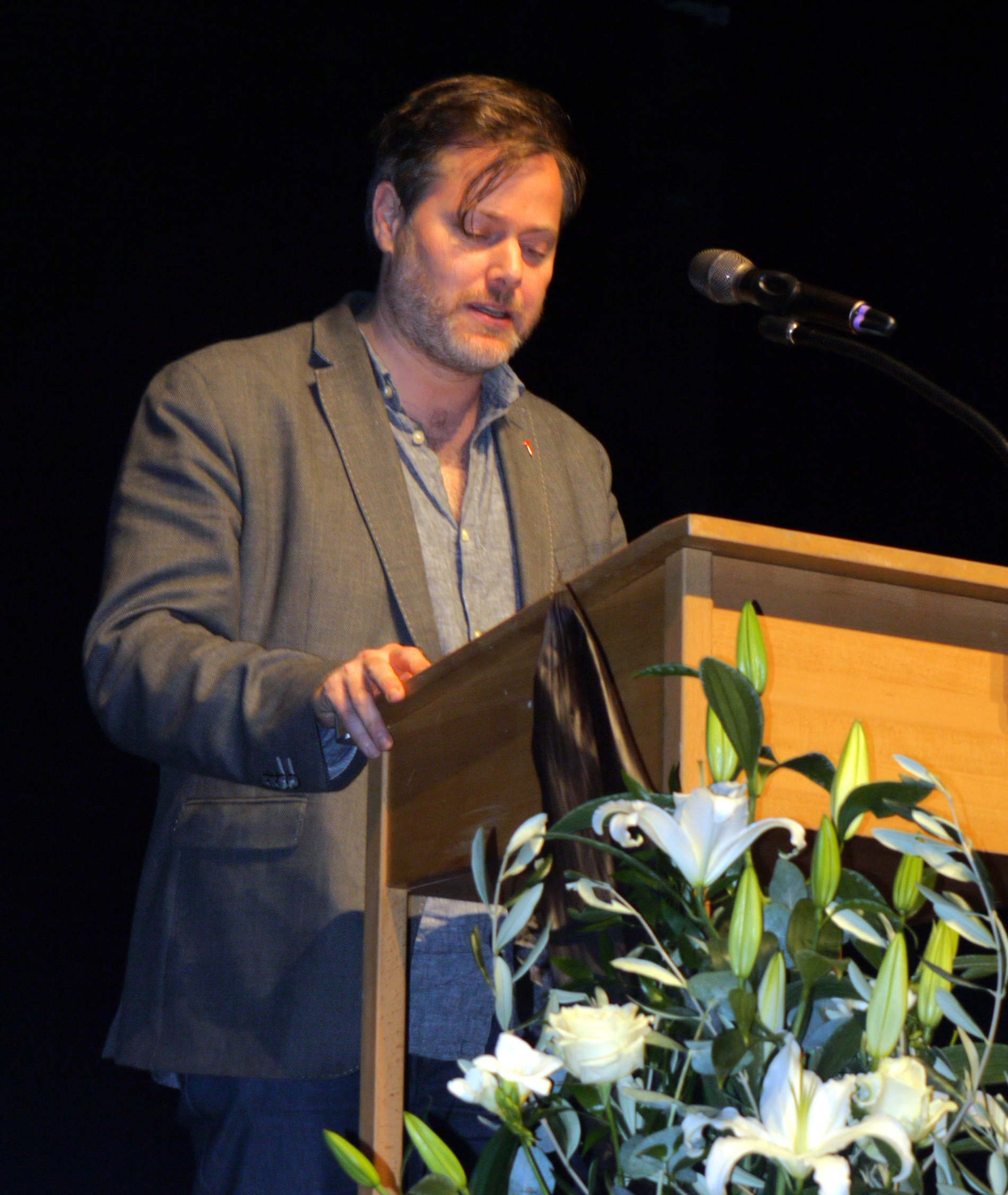
Milo Rau at the awards ceremony for the Peter Weiss Award (2017)

Milo Rau (born 1977) is a Swiss theatre director, journalist, playwright, essayist, and lecturer. In 2007 he founded a theatre and film production company, the International Institute of Political Murder (IIPM), and from 2018 until 2023 was the artistic director of the Belgian theatre group NTGent, in Ghent, transforming its direction. He is known for his political theatre. In July 2023 he became artistic director of the Vienna Festival (Wiener Festwochen).

== Early life and education ==
Milo Rau was born in 1977 in Bern, Switzerland. His father's Jewish family moved from Germany to Switzerland to escape the Nazis shortly before World War II, while his mother, surnamed Larese, had Italian origins. His parents divorced when he was about two years old. Until he was 18, his name was Milo Larese, but then he decided his name was too romantic, so he took the father's family name Rau.

He studied sociology, German studies, and Romance studies in Paris, Zürich, and Berlin, working under the instruction of Tzvetan Todorov and Pierre Bourdieu, among others.

== Career ==
In 1997, he travelled as a journalist to the state of Chiapas in Mexico, and to Cuba. In 2000 he began writing for the Swiss daily newspaper Neue Zürcher Zeitung.

Since 2002, he has been active as a playwright, author, and director in Switzerland and abroad, working with the Maxim Gorki Theater and Hebbel am Ufer in Berlin, Staatsschauspiel Dresden, the Théâtre Nanterre-Amandiers in Paris, and many other theatres.

=== IIPM ===
In 2007, he founded a theatre and film production company, the International Institute of Political Murder (IIPM). The company was originally founded to coordinate Rau's project The Last Days of the Ceausescus, but over time, its focus broadened to "the multimedia treatment of historical and sociopolitical conflicts." Since its founding, the IIPM has realised more than 50 theatrical productions, films, books, exhibitions, and political actions. Headquartered in Berlin, IIPM also has offices in Ghent, as well as St Gallen in Switzerland.

The Last Hours of Elena and Nicolae Ceaușescu (2009/10), later called The Last Days of the Ceausescus (Die letzten Tage der Ceausescus) was a re-enactment of the trial that convicted Romanian Communist leaders Elena and Nicolae Ceaușescu and condemned them to execution on Christmas Day in 1989. IIPM was able to obtain testimonies from individuals directly involved in the Romanian revolution (including dissidents, politicians, revolutionaries and ordinary Romanians) and the trial of the Ceaușescus, (including the general who betrayed them, the officer who captured them, and one of the soldiers who shot them). Rau wrote the script (which was published as a book) and directed the performance, which, after being cut short after two performances in the Odeon Theatre in Bucharest, premiered at Hebbel am Ufer (HAU) in Berlin before touring Switzerland at the Schlachthaus Theater in Bern, Theaterhaus Gessnerallee in Zurich, and Südpol in Lucerne. It was also produced at the Festival d'Avignon in France. A documentary film (Die letzten Tage der Ceausescus), co-directed by Marcel Bächtiger and Rau, includes the stage production and footage from backstage at the Odeon, as well as eyewitness interviews and archival material, and deconstructs the play.

Hate Radio (2011/12) documents a Rwandan radio station and its role in the Rwandan genocide. It was invited to show at the Berliner Theatertreffen, and was produced at HAU2 in May 2012.

Breivik's Statement (2012) presents Norwegian mass-murderer Anders Breivik's actual address to the Oslo District Court, which were banned from TV and withheld from the public. The address was read by Turkish German actress Sascha Ö. Soydan. Its world premiere was on 19 October 2012 at the Deutsches Nationaltheater Weimar in Weimar, Germany. It was staged in March 2014 in Brussels Town Hall, in a Belgian premiere, and at the CAMPO arts centre in Ghent in December 2015.

In 2013, Rau, in some of his most overtly political work, staged show trials in Zürich (The Zurich Trials), and Moscow (The Moscow Trials). The Moscow Trials examined Russia's record on free speech. According to Rau, "These trials act out or embody the real act of justice".

In June 2015, for The Congo Tribunal, Rau convened an assembly of 60 victims, perpetrators, witnesses, and analysts of the Second Congo War. Staged in Bukavu in the Democratic Republic of Congo, the performance it entailed a mock court that would adjudicate on the effect of the mining industry on the people of the Congo. Real lawyers, expert jury, and judge participated on stage, and the performance indirectly led to two ministerial resignations. The Guardian called it perhaps "the most ambitious political theatre ever staged"; Die Zeit wrote: "an insane project. Where politics fails, only art can help."

In 2016, Rau's controversial play Five Easy Pieces, in which child actors play out the crimes of the child molester and serial murderer Marc Dutroux, became the first foreign production awarded the Special Prize of the Jury of Belgian Theater Critics. In 2017, the play was invited to the Berliner Theatertreffen.

=== NTGent ===
In 2018 he became the artistic director of NTGent in Ghent, Belgium, succeeding the Dutch director Johan Simons. It was his intention to establish a "global popular theatre", specialising in international tours, and upon assuming the directorship he published his 10-point "Ghent Manifesto", in which he declared "It's not just about portraying the world anymore. It's about changing it. The aim is not to depict the real, but to make the representation itself real".

In 2018, Rau opened his first season at the NTGent with the play Lam Gods, based on the Ghent Altarpiece and developed with his ensemble on the basis of their "Ghent Manifesto". In addition, he began the series Goldenes Buch/Golden Book, publishing "programmatic texts about theater, aesthetics, and politics", as well as texts about larger projects at NTGent, in cooperation with the Verbrecher Verlag.

In 2019, an NTGent production of his piece La Reprise. Histoire(s) du théâtre (I), about the homophobic murder of Ihsane Jarfi in Liège in 2012, premiered at the Kunstenfestivaldesarts in Brussels in May 2018. It was also performed at the Edinburgh International Festival in August 2019. It was the first in the series Histoire(s) du Théâtre created by Rau (its title referring to Jean-Luc Godard's documentary film Histoire(s) du Cinéma).

Rau and his NTGent team travelled to the state of Pará in Brazil, where Amazonian forests are being destroyed and replaced by the cultivation of soy monoculture. In collaboration with the Movimento dos Trabalhadores Rurais Sem Terra (MST; "Landless Workers Movement"), and NTGent, Rau created Antigone in the Amazon, an allegorical play about the impact of the modern state and impact on traditional land rights, which causes huge displacements of people and devastation of culture. Scenes were filmed in Brazil, and the performance combines storytelling, music, film, and theatre, to illustrate its themes of political protest, state brutality, and heroism, based on Sophocles' play Antigone; a Greek tragedy transposed to a modern village in the Amazon. The play premiered in May 2023, before going on tour in Europe. The play is performed in several languages, with English subtitles for its 2024 run at the Adelaide Festival in Adelaide, South Australia, in March 2024.

=== 2020–present ===
In 2020, the Rau's film The New Gospel premiered at the 77th Venice International Film Festival. Rau stepped down from the role of artistic director of NTGent in January 2023, although he continues to be involved with the theatre company.

In July 2023 he became artistic director of the Vienna Festival.

In 2025, Rau created a new verbatim play titled The Pelicot Trial: Tribute to Gisèle Pelicot, co-written with Servane Dècle, recounting the trial of Dominique Pelicot for the multiple rapes of his wife. It premiered at the Vienna Festival before performances at the Festival d'Avignon and across Europe and the US. In September of that year, Rau was ordered by the Vienna regional court to withdraw his book Resistance Has No Form, Resistance Is the Form from publication; the collection of speeches and essays contained a passage alleging that former FPÖ leader Heinz-Christian Strache had sung a song mocking the victims of the Holocaust. Rau acknowledged that the statement was "a factual error" but criticised what he described as 'a broader pattern of nationalist parties using legal means to intimidate critical voices in the arts'.

== Other activities ==
Alongside his work as a playwright and director, Rau has taught directing, cultural theory, and social sculpture at various universities and conservatories. He was also a regular guest on the Swiss talk show Literaturclub.

He has also engaged in more overtly political actions, from introducing a self-declared interim government in St. Gallen, Switzerland, and calling for foreigners' right to vote (City of Change).

== Recognition and awards ==
Rau's work has earned him invitations to some of the world's largest theatre and arts festivals, including the 2012-2013 Berliner Theatertreffen, the Festival d'Avignon, the Venice Biennale, the Vienna Festival, and the Kunstenfestivaldesarts in Brussels, has been toured in more than 30 countries.

He won the Schweizer Theaterpreis in 2014. the Hörspielpreis der Kriegsblinden, and the jury prize of the festival Politik im Freien Theater, among others, and was the youngest-ever winner of the Preis des Internationalen Theaterinstituts.

In 2015, the Tages-Anzeiger wrote: "Milo Rau, whose documentary-theatrical explosions regularly fill houses, has managed to cast his art far out of the ivory tower."

In 2018, Rau was awarded the XV Europe Prize Theatrical Realities, in Saint Petersburg, with the following motivation:

A time when the complexity of the world and the events that characterise the whole planet is being neutralised by a torrent of too-speedy and superficial information, often in the service of economic and political interests, history can become volatile and confused with news items. In this context, Milo Rau's theatre appears as "necessary theatre": by putting its emphasis on events (political, social or other news items) and expanding them, it is forcing us to reflect and understand the realities of today's life, and where our politics, humanity’s ancestral violence, our society and our lives are heading. Rau's work, enriched by his remarkable literary, sociological, journalistic, cinematic and visual experience, is something that can give us hope that a vision that is critical, humanistic, cosmopolitan and throws light on the world can still be conceivable today.

== Reception ==
Rau has been called "one of the most important and influential personalities in the European theater." He has also been variously described as the "most influential" (Die Zeit), "most awarded" (Le Soir), "most interesting" (De Standaard), "most controversial" (La Repubblica), "most scandalous" (New York Times), and "most ambitious" (The Guardian) artist of our time. His controversial work is often accompanied by trials and public debate, bringing him the reputation of a "scandal director".

Notable reactions to specific performances include:

- Breivik's Statement was banned from performance in Munich's Haus der Kunst in March 2013, which was to be staged as part of the "Radikal Jung" young director festival. Organisers of the festival, Munich Volkstheater, had rented the hall for the performance, but it was unable to be performed owing to "a clause in the rental agreement that excludes right-wing extremist and anti-Semitic content", according to spokesperson Elena Heitsch. In 2019, it was not allowed to be performed at the Nationaltheater Weimar as part of a congress organised by Rau, under the title "Power and Dissent".

- A few days before the planned premiere of The Last Days of the Ceausescus in July 2010 at the Odeon Theatre in Bucharest, in 2010, Nicolae and Elena Ceaușescu's son-in-law Mircea Oprean (the widower of Zoia Ceaușescu, who died in 2006), forced his way into rehearsals, saying that he and his brother-in-law Valentin Ceaușescu had registered the name "Ceauşescu" as a trademark in 2008, and it could not be used in the title. A lawsuit followed, and the director was forced to cancel the show after two performances.
- Russian authorities raided his Moscow Trials.
- Performances of Five Easy Pieces were censored or cancelled in Singapore and various German cities.

== Selected works ==
- 2025 The Pelicot Trial: Tribute to Gisèle Pelicot (together with Servane Dècle)
- 2024 Medea's Children
- 2023 Antigone in the Amazon
- 2022 Everywoman, Berlin (theatre)
- 2020 Familie, NTGent (theatre)
- 2019 Oreste in Mosul, Mosul (theatre)
- 2018 La Reprise. Histoire(s) du théâtre (I) (theatre) (Note: First in a series created by Rau, called Histoire(s) du Théâtre; Others in the series include Histoire(s) du Théâtre II (which included a re-enactment of a famous 1970s dance performance by the Congolese National Ballet), directed by Congolese choreographer Faustin Linyekula; Spanish director Angélica Liddell's In Liebestod - Histoire(s) du Théâtre III; Miet Warlop's Histoire(s) du Théâtre IV: One Song (2022); and English artist and writer Tim Etchells' Histoire(s) du Théâtre V: How Goes The World (2023–24).)
- 2017 Lenin, Berlin (theatre)
- 2017 The 120 Days of Sodom, Zürich (theatre)
- 2016 Empire, Berlin (theatre, Book)
- 2016 Five Easy Pieces, Ghent (theatre)
- 2016 Compassion: The History of a Machine Gun, Berlin (theatre, radio play)
- 2015 The Dark Ages, Munich (theatre, book)
- 2015 The Congo Tribunal, Berlin/Bukavu (theatre, film, book)
- 2014 The Civil Wars, Brussels/Zürich (theatre, book)
- 2013 The Berlin Dialogues, Berlin (talkshow)
- 2013 The revelation of the real, Berlin (installation, book)
- 2013 The Zurich Trials, Zürich (theatre, film, book)
- 2013 The Moscow Trials, Moscow (theatre, film, installation, book)
- 2012 Breivik's Statement, Weimar/Berlin (lecture performance)
- 2011 Hate Radio, Bregenz/Kigali/Berlin (theatre, film, installation, book, radio play)
- 2010 City of Change, St. Gallen (theatre performance, book, film)
- 2010 Land of Hope, Berlin (Performance)
- 2009 The last days of the Ceausescus, Bucharest/Berlin (theatre, film, book)
