= Jolie Ngemi =

Congolese dancer and performance artist

- Born: 16 April 1989 (age 37); Kinshasa
- Citizenship: Democratic Republic of the Congo
- Occupations: Dancer & choreographer
- Website: https://www.instagram.com/joellielapanthere/?hl=en

Jolie Ngemi (born 16 April 1989) is a dancer and performance artist from the Democratic Republic of the Congo.

== Biography ==
Dance in the Crossroads 2 - Ngemi is on the left

Poster - Dance in the Crossroads

Ngemi was born on 16 April 1989. She has danced from an early age: she first began to dance in Kinshasa at the Protestant church there. She also took part in hip-hop dance battles in the streets of Kinshasa with the group, Rue Des Danses Urbains Hip-hop. She moved to Brussels to study at The Performing Arts and Research Training School (P.A.R.T.S.). She studied there for two years.

== Career ==
Ngemi is a well-known dancer and choreographer from the DRC. Her style of dance fuses Congolese dances from the streets and clubs with European traditions of dance. The style is described it as Chakamadesu A U C - Afro, Urban & Contemporary (chaka madesu is a Congolese stew, cooked in a variety of ways). In 2006 she worked with the choreographer Jacques Banayang, who introduced her to contemporary dance. In 2008 she toured Africa and Europe as part of a work created by the choreographer Thomas Styeart. She has worked with Ula Sickle on a project entitled Jolie and on other projects well-known choreographers. She has worked with Boris Charmatz on several projects.

Ngemi's work can be political and in 2015 she collaborated with rapper and producer Baloji on a work that criticised the influence that cellphone and alcohol industries have on society in the DRC. One venue for this performance was at the Fondation Cartier in Paris. The work Jolie has been performed around the world, including at the Reykjavik Dance Festival. It too is political, questioning where the profit from its mineral wealth in diamonds, coltan and tin ends up. Her 2018 work Identity n’a ngai collaborated with composer Yann Leguay, who used field recordings from Kinshasa at night to inform to piece. In 2019 she performed in the ensemble for Ligia Lewis' production Water Mill.
