= Contredanse (organisation) =

Contredanse is a documentation center for contemporary dance funded by the French Community of Belgium and is located in Brussels. It provides choreographers and dancers with tools and resources to connect their studio practice with academic inquiry by providing documentation about the philosophy of movement, body, composition and a history of the discipline. Their services include providing information about the sector, trainings, publishing and documentation.

The name of the organisation alludes to country dance or contradance which gave rise to the first dance notation system which in turn inspired the notation system which remained the standard until the mid-19th century.

== History ==
Contredanse was founded in 1984 by dancer and choreographer Patricia Kuypers in order to support and stimulate choreographic activity and bring Brussels-based dancers in contact with big names in the international dance scene. The Dance Documentation Center was founded by Claire Destrée in 1985. In 1990 Contredance launched their review Nouvelles de Danse as a resource for dancers to link theory to their studio practice. Since 1997 Contredance publishes an independent news publication in order to reserve the review for innovative thinking.

== Communication, training and events ==
Contredanse informs the dance scene with regard to auditions, festivals and trainings in the French-speaking community as well as internationally. Contredanse hosts master classes and covers topics such as composition, somatic techniques, (contact) improvisation and new technologies, etc. In the past Contredanse already hosted Susanne Linke, Trisha Brown, Dana Reitz, Jennifer Tipton, Barre Phillips, Josef Nadj, Julyen Hamilton, Katie Duck, Simone Forti, Susan Buirge, Nancy Stark Smith, Lisa Nelson, Bonnie Bainbridge Cohen, Mark Coniglio, Dawn Stopiello, Steve Paxton, and others. Additionally they host performances, exhibitions, seminars, round tables, conferences and book launches.

== Dance Documentation Center ==
Their archive, the Dance Documentation Center is open to the public and collects content related to choreography and ideas, practice and philosophy concerning contemporary dance. Their collections include books, articles, reviews, programmes, press articles as well as photos and audiovisual material.

== Publications ==
- Nouvelles de Danse news review published every three months. It communicates performances scheduled in Belgium, new dance works, choreography projects and topical debates.
