= Nacera Belaza =

Algerian dancer and choreographer

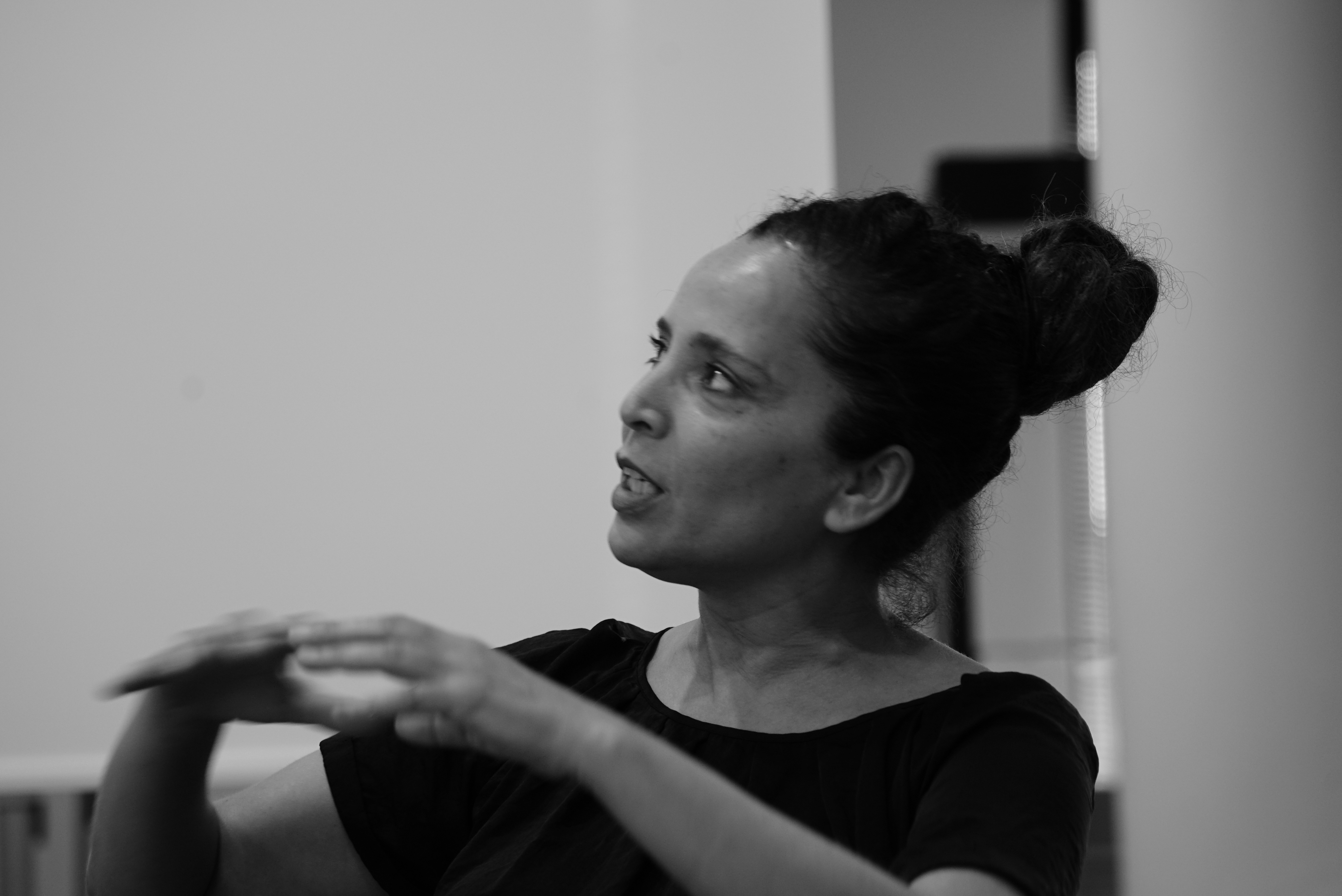
- Born: Médéa, Algeria
- Education: University of Reims Champagne-Ardenne
- Occupations: Dancer, conceptual choreographer
- Years active: 1989–present
- Organization: Nacera Belaza Company
- Known for: Minimalist dance performances featuring repetition and austere staging
- Awards: Chevalier de l'Ordre des Arts et des Lettres (2015) Syndicat de la Critique Prize for Le Cri; SACD Choreographic Prize (2017) 100 Women of Culture – Femmes de Culture (2021)

Nacera Belaza is an Algerian dancer and conceptual choreographer who is known for performances that present repeated actions in an austere manner.

== Biography ==
Belaza was born in Médéa, Algeria and moved to France at the age of 5. As a child she did not attend dance classes, instead she danced in her own room. She studied French literature at University of Reims Champagne-Ardenne and then founded in 1989 her own dance company, the Nacera Belaza Company. Early in her career she was most often performing with her sister, Dalila. By the 2010s, she began including other dancers in her performances. She maintains her connection to Algeria.

== Awards and honors ==
Belaza earned the title of Chevalier de l'Ordre des Arts et des Lettres in 2015. Belaza was awarded the Syndicat de la Critique Prize for her piece Le Cri and the SACD Choreographic Prize in 2017. In 2021, she was named one of the 100 Women of Culture by the French association Femmes de Culture.
