= Mette Ingvartsen =

Danish dancer and choreographer

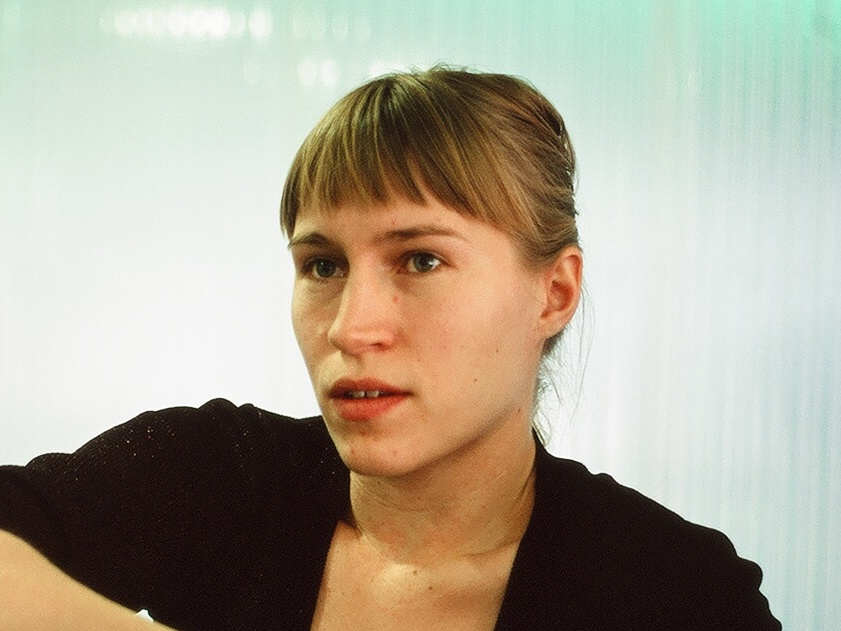
- Ingvartsen in 2010
- Born: Denmark
- Education: P.A.R.T.S., Lund University / UNIARTS (PhD)
- Occupations: Dancer, choreographer, performance artist
- Years active: 2003–present
- Organization: Great Investment
- Notable work: *Manual Focus* (2003); *The Artificial Nature Series* (2009–2012); *The Red Pieces* (2014–2017); *Choreomania* (2025)
- Awards: Lifetime Achievement Award, Danish Arts Foundation (2024)

Mette Ingvartsen is a Danish dancer, choreographer and performance artist who has been active since the early 2000s. She founded the dance company Great Investment in 2003. Since then, her work has been shown throughout Europe, as well as in the United States, Canada, Australia and Asia. In 2024, she received the Lifetime Achievement Award from the Danish Arts Foundation (Statens Kunstfond).

== Training ==
Mette Ingvartsen came into contact with the dance world at a very young age; she was a member of the Junior Company led by the Swedish choreographer Marie Brolin Tani in Aarhus, Denmark. Since 1999, she subsequently studied in Amsterdam and Brussels, where she graduated in 2004 from the dance school P.A.R.T.S., which was founded by choreographer Anne Teresa De Keersmaeker. Afterwards she obtained a PhD in choreography at UNIARTS / Lund University in Sweden. Its subject was the relationship between an artist's theoretical work and their artistic practice.

== Work as a choreographer ==
Ingvartsen in a 2020 group performance of her 2003 piece Manual Focus

Since 2002 Mette Ingvartsen has worked in Brussels on an oeuvre of choreographies, performances and 'living installations' that are both conceptual and very physical. Her artistic work never sets apart from research and theoretical concepts. She created her first performance, Manual Focus (2003), while still studying. After that she initiated various research projects and created a wide range of performances, including 50/50 (2004), to come (2005), Why We Love Action (2007), It’S In The Air (2008), Giant City (2009) and All the way out there... (2011). Questions about kinesthesia, perception, affect and sensation are central. Although she studied for four years at P.A.R.T.S., a dance school known for a highly physical education, Mette Ingvartsen started to consider choreographing as a practice that not only relates to the physical body of the dancer but also to different types non-human performers and animated materials. She even takes away the dancer's body from the scene, and she shifts the hierarchy between the body and the objects in dance. That started with the production Evaporated landscapes (2009), a choreography / performance for foam, fog, light and sound instead of (dancing) bodies.

== The Artificial Nature Series ==
This interest in expansion has resulted in a series of projects that extend choreography to non-human materials. Together they form The Artificial Nature Series, a series of five productions that were created between 2009 and 2012. The Extra Sensorial Garden (2010) was presented in Copenhagen and The Light Forest (2010) could be visited during Szene Salzburg in July 2010 and 2011. In Speculations (2011), the spectator experienced a storytelling session. The Artificial Nature Project (2012) closed the series and reintroduced the human performer into a network of connections between human and non-human actors.

== The Red Pieces ==
Following this series of productions that focused on animated, non-human materials, a return to the human body prompted. This resulted in a new series of productions in which the body, sexuality, nudity, privacy and the way in which they are connected to the public atmosphere are central. Sexuality and the naked body became a means to exploring participation and the collective. In 2014, Mette Ingvartsen, began working on a new cycle titled The Red Pieces. 69 positions (2014) opened that series and questioned the boundaries between private and public space by literally placing the naked body between the theater audience. In the second production, 7 pleasures (2015), she examines seven concepts of pleasure. Twelve performers give shape to sensory sensations. In a long sensual movement, bodies touch each other, lose their limits, vibrate and form unexpected compositions and constellations with things around them. The third production is to come (extended) (2017). It is based on to come (2005), a former work by Mette Ingvartsen for five dancers. The reason for revisiting this choreography with fifteen instead of five dancers in Ingvartsen's desire to refract the current politics of sex through the joyful tone of the production from 2005. The series The Red Pieces also includes 21 pornographies (2017) and The Permeable Stage (2016). The first one is a production that has the presence of pornography in many parts of society as a starting point and explores the operations of the pornographic through a collection of erotic and affective materials. The second one is a meeting of artists and theorists that is focussed on the way in which sexuality is present everywhere, how it transcends the human body, and can be found in the relationships with objects, instruments, environments and media technologies.

== Collaborations ==
From 2013 to 2016, Mette Ingvartsen was artist-in-residence at the Brussels Kaaitheater, which has been showing her work since 2004. From 2010 to 2015 she was connected to the network apap - advancing performing arts project. In the period from 2017 to 2022, she is a member of the artistic team led by Chris Dercon at the Volksbühne in Berlin. In addition to the creation and performance of her own work, Mette Ingvartsen participated as a performer in projects by Jan Ritsema / Bojana Cvejic, Xavier Le Roy and Boris Charmatz.

== Work as a teacher ==
In addition to her performances, Mette Ingvartsen is researching, writing and documenting artistic work. She teaches classes and workshops on developing methodologies of choreographic practices. Since 2005, she is working on everybodys, an open and collaborative project based on the principle of open source. The project aims to produce tools and techniques which can be used by artists in the creation of their work. In 2017, Mette Ingvartsen is Valeska Gert Visiting Professor at Freie Universität Berlin. During one semester, she is working with students on the Viscous Environments Project, which deals with how a so-called 'durational environment', a mix of an installation and a long-term performance, can be created using human bodies and not-human performers. Mette Ingvartsen also teaches at P.A.R.T.S., where she regularly teaches Choreography & Composition as part of the studio programme. Together with the forty students of Generation XIV at P.A.R.T.S., she also spent three years working on creating a dance performance. They immersed themselves in medieval dance manias and explored their significance in today's world, which is characterised by crisis and protest. The result was the production Choreomania (2025).

== Work as an editor, researcher and curator ==
She also works as an editor for the everybodys publications. In 2008, she participated in 6Months1Location, a project by Xavier Le Roy and Bojana Cvejic on questions about education, production structures and artistic exchange. In the 6-month YouTube project Where's My Privacy, she tried to rethink choreographic production through today's communication tools. As an extension of 6M1L, she co-organized the festival In-presentable 09 in Madrid, at the invitation of Juan Dominguez. On the occasion of the restaging 69 Positions and 7 pleasures at the Kaaitheater, Mette Ingvartsen organized The Permeable Stage, a performative conference on the politics of sexuality in relation to the public and private sphere.

== Productions ==
Own productions:

- Solo negatives (Mette Ingvartsen, 2002)
- Manual Focus (Mette Ingvartsen, 2003)
- Out Of Order (Mette Ingvartsen, 2004)
- 50/50 (Mette Ingvartsen, 2004)
- To come (Mette Ingvartsen, 2005)
- Why We Love Action (Mette Ingvartsen / Great Investment, 2007)
- It's In The Air (Mette Ingvartsen / Great Investment in collaboration with Jefta van Dinther / Sure Basic, 2008)
- Giant City (Mette Ingvartsen / Great Investment, 2009)
- Evaporated landscapes (Mette Ingvartsen / Great Investment, 2009)
- The Extra Sensorial Garden (Mette Ingvartsen / Great Investment, 2010)
- The Light Forest (Mette Ingvartsen / szene Salzburg, 2010)
- All the way out there... (Mette Ingvartsen / Great Investment in collaboration with Guillem Mont de Palol, 2011)
- Speculations (Mette Ingvartsen / Great Investment, 2011)
- The Artificial Nature Project (Mette Ingvartsen / Great Investment, 2012)
- 69 positions (Mette Ingvartsen / Great Investment, 2014)
- 7 pleasures (Mette Ingvartsen / Great Investment, 2015)
- To come (extended) (Mette Ingvartsen / Great Investment, 2017)
- 21 pornographies (Mette Ingvartsen / Great Investment, 2017)
- All Around (Mette Ingvartsen / Great Investment, 2019)
- Moving in Concert (Mette Ingvartsen / Great Investment, 2019)
- The Blue Piece (Mette Ingvartsen / Great Investment, 2021)
- The Life Work (Mette Ingvartsen / Great Investment / commissioned by Ruhrtriennale in collaboration with Museum Folkwang, 2021)
- The Dancing Public (Mette Ingvartsen / Great Investment, 2021)
- Skatepark (Mette Ingvartsen / Great Investment, 2023)
- RUSH (Mette Ingvartsen / Great Investment, 2024)
- Choreomania (Mette Ingvartsen / Great Investment & P.A.R.T.S., 2025)
- Delirious Night (Mette Ingvartsen / Great Investment, 2025)

Productions by others:

- KnowH2Ow (Jan Ritsema, Bojana Cvejic, Mette Ingvartsen and Sandy Williams, 2006)
- Quintette Cercle (Boris Charmatz, 2006)
- Low pieces (Xavier Le Roy, 2009–2011)

== Sources ==
- Website of Mette Ingvartsen
- Vimeo channel of Mette Ingvartsen
