= Bruno Beltrão =

Brazilian choreographer (born 1979)

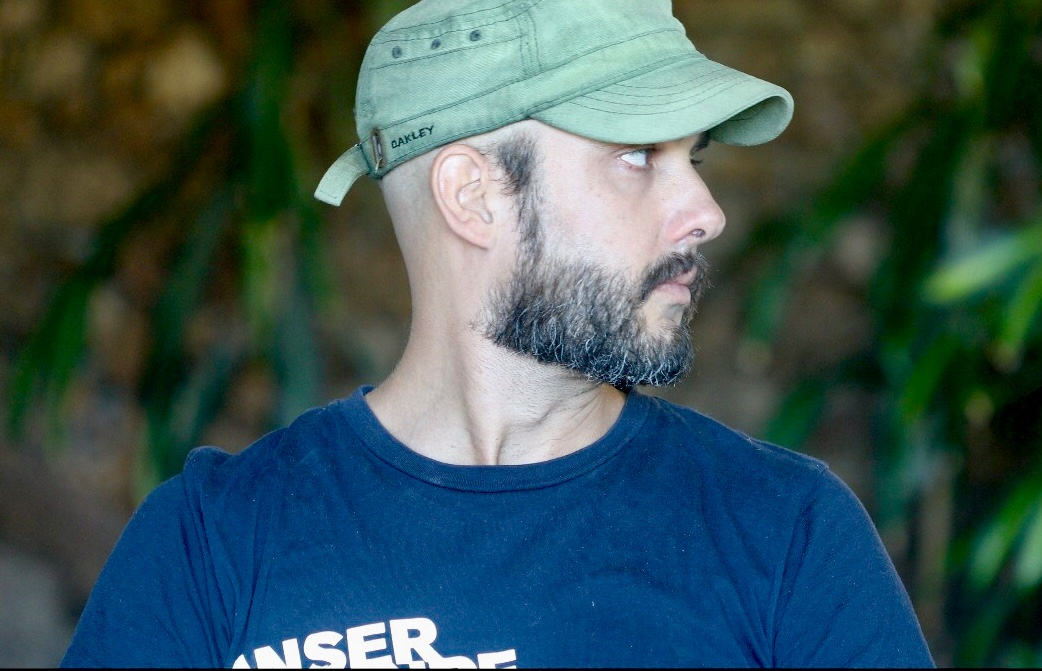
- Beltrão in 2007
- Born: Bruno Pereira Beltrão; September 19, 1979 (age 47); Niterói, Rio de Janeiro, Brazil
- Occupations: Director, choreographer

Bruno Beltrão (born 19 September 1979) is a Brazilian choreographer based in Niterói. He is known for his work with Grupo de Rua (GRN). Recognized for the integration of urban dance styles and experimental dance and theater, Beltrão has explored abstract choreographic forms while transforming traditional hip hop movements.

== Early life and education ==
He began his dance career at 13, attending local matinees in Niterói where he first engaged with hip hop. His formal dance training commenced in 1994 under Israeli teacher Yoram Szabo. By 1995, Beltrão started teaching street dance after his studies were interrupted.

== Career ==
Beltrão co-founded Grupo de Rua de Niterói with Rodrigo Bernardi in 1996, initially focusing on dance competitions. Over time, the group's artistic direction shifted to include a broader range of hip hop expressions in their performances.

In 2000, Beltrão joined the dance faculty at the Centro Universitário da Cidade in Rio de Janeiro. His contemporary dance debut was in 2001 with the duet "From Popping to Pop" at Duos de Dança no Sesc in Copacabana. That same year, he also collaborated with Eduardo Hermanson to create "Me and My Choreographer in 63." Following Bernardi’s departure at the end of 2001, Beltrão took over as the sole director of Grupo de Rua.

His works include "Too Legit to Quit" (2002), "Telesquat" (2003), "H2" (2005), "H3" (2008), "Crackz" (2013), "Inoah" (2017) and "Turvo"(2022). Since 2002, the group has performed in over 35 countries across multiple continents.

== International Influence ==
Grupo de Rua has showcased Beltrão’s choreographic style in numerous countries including Portugal, Spain, France, Germany, Belgium, Holland, Austria, Switzerland, Luxembourg, Croatia, Finland, Sweden, Italy, Scotland, England, Singapore, Canada, Argentina, Uruguay, Japan, South Korea, Morocco, Egypt, Jordan, Lebanon, Tunisia, Syria, Chile, United States, Norway, Greece, and Hungary.

== Works ==
- (2022) Turvo (new creation)
- (2017) Inoah
- (2013) Crackz
- (2008) H3
- (2005) H2
- (2003) Telesquat
- (2002) Too legit to quit
- (2001) Me and my choreographer in 63
- (2001) From popping to pop or vice-versa

.

== Awards and Indications ==
- (2020) The Bessies New York Dance and Performance Awards- 'Inoah'
- (2019) "Niteroi Semana de Dança - Homenagem" - Companhia de Ballet da Cidade de Niteroi
- (2018) APCA - São Paulo Arts Critics Association - Indicação "Espetáculo" - 'Inoah'
- (2010) The Bessies New York Dance and Performance Awards- 'H3'
- (2009) 5º Prêmio Bravo Prime de Cultura - "Dance Performance" - 'H3'
- (2009) Syndicat professionnel de la Critique de Théâtre, Musique et Danse "Mention spéciale du jury" - 'H3'
- (2008) APCA - São Paulo Arts Critics Association - "Choreographer" - 'H3'
- (2005) "Upcoming Choreographer of the Year" 'H2' - Balletanz Magazine
- (2004) "Prêmio Cultura nota 10" - Governo do Estado do Rio de Janeiro

.

== Mentions ==
- (2019) "Best Dance of 2019" - 'Inoah'- The New York Times
- (2018) "Tous nos spetacles préférés de 2018" - 'Inoah'- Le monde
- (2018) "Dança: O melhor do Ano" - 'Inoah'- O Publico
- (2017) "Performances of the year" - 'Inoah'- O GLOBO
- (2013) "Performances of the year" - 'Crackz'- O GLOBO
- (2010) "Vibrant Scene’s 20th-Century Base" - The New York Times
- (2008) "Performances of the year" - 'H3'- O GLOBO
- (2008) "Performances of the year" - 'H3'- Jornal do Brasil
- (2008) "Performances of the year" - 'H3' - Guia Folha de S.Paulo
- (2005) "Performances of the year" - 'H2' - O GLOBO
- (2003) "Performances of the year" - "Telesquat" - O GLOBO
- (2002) "Personagem do ano - Dança" - O GLOBO
- (2001) "Performances of the year" - "Me and my choreographer in 63" - O GLOBO

.

== Articles ==
- "Grupo de Rua at BAM, New York — the embodiment of turmoil" - Financial Times
- "Brazil Is Burning, and We’re Just Performing a Lot of Abstract Gestures"- The New York Times
- "Visto con voi: la nuova danza brasiliana a Torino" - La Guida
- "Review: Brazilian Troupe Grupo de Rua in a Dark Urban Vision" - The New York Times
- "Wutentbrannt und wunderbar" - Neue Zürcher Zeitung
- "De danse en performance, l’état des corps du Brésil" - La Libre
- "Um coreógrafo no futuro" O Público
- "A arte da ameaça do brasileiro Bruno Beltrão" Le Monde
- "Running backwards in advance of oneself" Corpus.be
- "Here is dancing the future" Berner Zeitung
- "Brazilian street meets the stage" The New York Times
- "The reinvention of Breakdance" Der Standard
- "Ok, Isso que eu faço não é Hip Hop" Balletanz Magazine
- "The break dance's quiet tenderness" Der Standard
- "Intelectual Hip hop" Tagesspiegel
- "Quando o corpo é multiplicado por 9" Jornal O Estado de S. Paulo
- "Coreógrafo de Niterói dança hoje em Londres" Folha de S.Paulo
- "Goethe Institut - Interview" Goethe Institut
- "Grupo de Rua comes to Southern California" Los Angeles Times
