= Kunstenfestivaldesarts =

Arts festival in Brussels, Belgium

- Status: Active
- Genre: Multi-genre arts festival
- Frequency: Annually in May
- Venue: Kaaitheater and many other venues
- Location: Brussels
- Country: Belgium
- Inaugurated: May 1994
- Founder: Frie Leysen
- Most recent: May 2023
- Previous event: May 2022
- Next event: 10 May 2024 – 1 June 2024
- Leader: Daniel Blanga Gubbay and Dries Douibi
- Website: kfda.be/en/home/

The Kunstenfestivaldesarts (KFDA) is an annual international multi-genre arts festival that takes place in several locations in Brussels, Belgium. The festival, founded in 1994 by Frie Leysen, is a celebration of the arts by both the Flemish and French-speaking Belgians, which hosts a variety of international artists each year.

As of 2024, the artistic directors of the festival are Daniel Blanga Gubbay and Dries Douibi.

== History ==
Kunstenfestivaldesarts (KFDA) was established in Brussels by Frie Leysen in 1994, the year after the establishment of the European Union, which has its headquarters in the city. It was Leysen's vision that Brussels become an intellectual and cultural capital as well as a political one. Brussels is also the only city in the country where both Flemish people and (French-speaking) Walloons live side by side, and it was intended that the festival serve both communities and help to break down traditional barriers between the two.

Leysen was supported by co-director, Guy-do Minne from 1994 until 2000, after which Roger Christmann took up this role.

Christophe Slagmuylder began working as Leysen's partner from 2002, until her departure after the 2006 edition of the festival, when he assumed the role of artistic director. He particularly emphasised the words "urban" and "cosmopolitan" in his first festival in 2007, as Brussels was a very cosmopolitan city.

After Slagmuylder left, Daniel Blanga Gubbay and Dries Douibi became co-artistic directors in October 2018, thus starting with the 2019 festival. They wished to redefine and emphasise the relationship between local and international, and wanted to embrace institutions not formerly used as venues used by KFDA, thus reaching new communities in the city.

== Description ==
The festival, held in May each year in Brussels, an international festival dedicated to the performing arts that includes theatre, dance, film, and visual arts. Its main hub is the Kaaitheater, but it holds events in around thirty venues in the city, including theatres, cultural centres, museums, and public spaces, not all well-known by the public.

It also hosts a "Free School" to share knowledge and artistic practices, and a series of Communities projects. These initiatives enable connections among students, associations, performing arts professionals, or any members of the public.

It features international artists, artists who live and work in Brussels, and members of both Flemish and French communities. Programmes are published in French, Flemish, and English, and all shows in foreign languages are subtitled in French and Flemish.

The festival has been sponsored by LVMH for several years in the past. It has introduced a number of new artists to the public in Brussels, including Toshiki Okada, Bruno Beltrão, Milo Rau, El Conde de Torrefiel, Kris Verdonck, and Ula Sickle.

== Governance ==
The festival is governed by a board of directors drawn equally from both French- and Flemish–speaking communities, with a president from each. All are politically independent.

=== Artistic directors ===
- Frie Leysen (1994–2006)
- Christophe Slagmuylder (2007–2018), studied contemporary art at the Université libre de Bruxelles and afterwards taught at La Cambre (l'Ecole Nationale Superieure) in Brussels. He also worked with a number of dance companies, including Anne Teresa De Keersmaeker's school, P.A.R.T.S.
- Daniel Blanga Gubbay and Dries Douibi (2019–present), initially with Sophie Alexandre, (Note: Alexandre is not listed as part of the team coordinating the 2024 festival.) took over from Slagmuylder in October 2018. Gubbay had worked as a performing arts researcher and freelance curator, including creating a platform for public programs through theory and artistic interventions called Aleppo. He started programming for the Kunstenfestivaldesarts in 2017. Douibi had worked as a dramaturg with Jozef Wouters, Kate McIntosh, Milo Rau and many other artists, and had co-curated the Bâtard Festival along with Michiel Vandevelde (2013–2018), and since 2018 had curated the performing arts program at Beursschouwburg, an arts centre in Brussels.

== Editions ==
=== 2014 ===
In 2014, the festival took place from 2 to 24 May. Among other events, it featured a discussion with Taiwanese filmmaker Tsai Ming-liang, festival director Christophe Slagmuylder, and a small group of invited guests.

=== 2019 ===
Egyptian instrumentalist Islam Chipsy, whose music fuses traditional Arabic wedding and electronic instruments, appeared at the 2019 festival.

=== 2022 ===
The 27th edition of KFDA, after an hiatus caused by the COVID-19 pandemic, was held over three weeks in May 2022. It was staged at more than 30 venues around the city, including the Kaaitheater. Among the works performed was a dance performance by choreographer François Chaignaud, and music by French composer Christophe Chassol. There was a puppet show by Peruvian artist Daniela Ortiz performed at various colonial monuments around the city, and Japanese theatre director Akira Takayama created guerrilla performances around the city using bicycle couriers.

=== 2023 ===
In 2023, there were many shows exploring queer identity. The festival hosted the world premiere of the dance production Prophetic (We've Already Been Born), choreographed by Nadia Beugré and inspired by the transgender community of Abidjan, Ivory Coast. Other dance performances included Several attempts at braiding my way home from Sweden by Adam and Amina Seid Tahir, and Fauve, by Greek choreographer Lenio Kaklea.

=== 2024 ===
The 2024 festival will be held from 10 May to 1 June 2024.
