= List of music festivals in Italy =

Italian music festivals Below is a list of music festivals in Italy :

== Festivals ==
- 10 Pianos Street is a charitable festival held in different cities each year.
- Agglutination Metal Festival in Sant'Arcangelo Founded in 1995, it is the oldest Metal Music Festival in Italy.
- Arena di Verona Opera during the summer months in the Roman amphitheater in Verona.
- Arezzo Wave in Arezzo Pop and Rock music founded in 1987.
- C2C Festival is an avant-pop festival held annually in Turin. It was founded in 2002.
- Dissonanze focused on electronic music, ran from 2000 to 2010.
- Festival dei Due Mondi (Festival of the two Worlds) in Spoleto Held since 1957, it has a program of symphonic music, opera, dance and jazz.
- Festival della canzone italiana or the San Remo Festival is a popular song contest held in Sanremo since 1951
- Festival di Napoli was a Neapolitan song contest which ran from (1952–1971, 1981, 1998–2004)
- Festival Verdi, mainly in Parma, is dedicated to the music of Verdi.
- Folkest in Spilimbergo
- Gods of Metal in Milan
- Heineken Jammin Festival in Venice is a pop/rock festival founded in 1998.
- Independent Days Festival is a pop/rock festival in Bologna and Milan founded in 1999.
- InterHarmony International Music Festival is a classical music festival in Acqui Terme, Piedmont, Italy and InterHarmony was founded in 2007.
- Liri Blues Festival Is a Blues festival founded in 1988 held in Isola del Liri, near Rome.
- Live Arts Week in Bologna - founded in 2011 when audio visual festival Netmage and contemporary arts festival F.I.S.Co. were combined.
- LOST Music Festival is an international festival founded in 2019 held in the world's largest bamboo maze, the Labirinto della Masone in Fontanellato.
- Mandrea Music Festival in Trento. Four day festival of Folk, Reggae, Rock and Electronic music in the Italian Alps overlooking Lake Garda.
- Maggio Musicale Fiorentino a selection of classical concerts generally from October through April in Florence.
- Music Fest Perugia Classical music in Perugia,
- Pescara Jazz Jazz music Festival in Pescara (from 1969).
- Piccola Accademia di Montisi in Montisi, Tuscany takes place every year in July. A festival devoted to the music of the harpsichord and early music/instruments
- Pistoia Blues Festival is a blues festival that takes place every July in Pistoia, Tuscany. The first edition was held in 1980
- Play It Loud! Festival in Orzinuovi
- Porretta Soul Festival in Porretta Terme
- Ravello Festival
- Rossini Opera Festival in Pesaro is dedicated to the music of Rossini.
- Rototom Sunsplash started as a two-day reggae music festival in Gaio di Spilimbergo in 1995, before moving to Benicàssim in Spain in 2009.
- Sagra Musicale Malatestiana in Rimini
- Surfer Joe Summer Festival is a four-day surf music festival founded in 2003 at Livorno.
- Tempo Reale
- Umbria Jazz Festival In Perugia, generally in July.
- Zephyr International Chamber Music Festival
