= Live Arts Week =

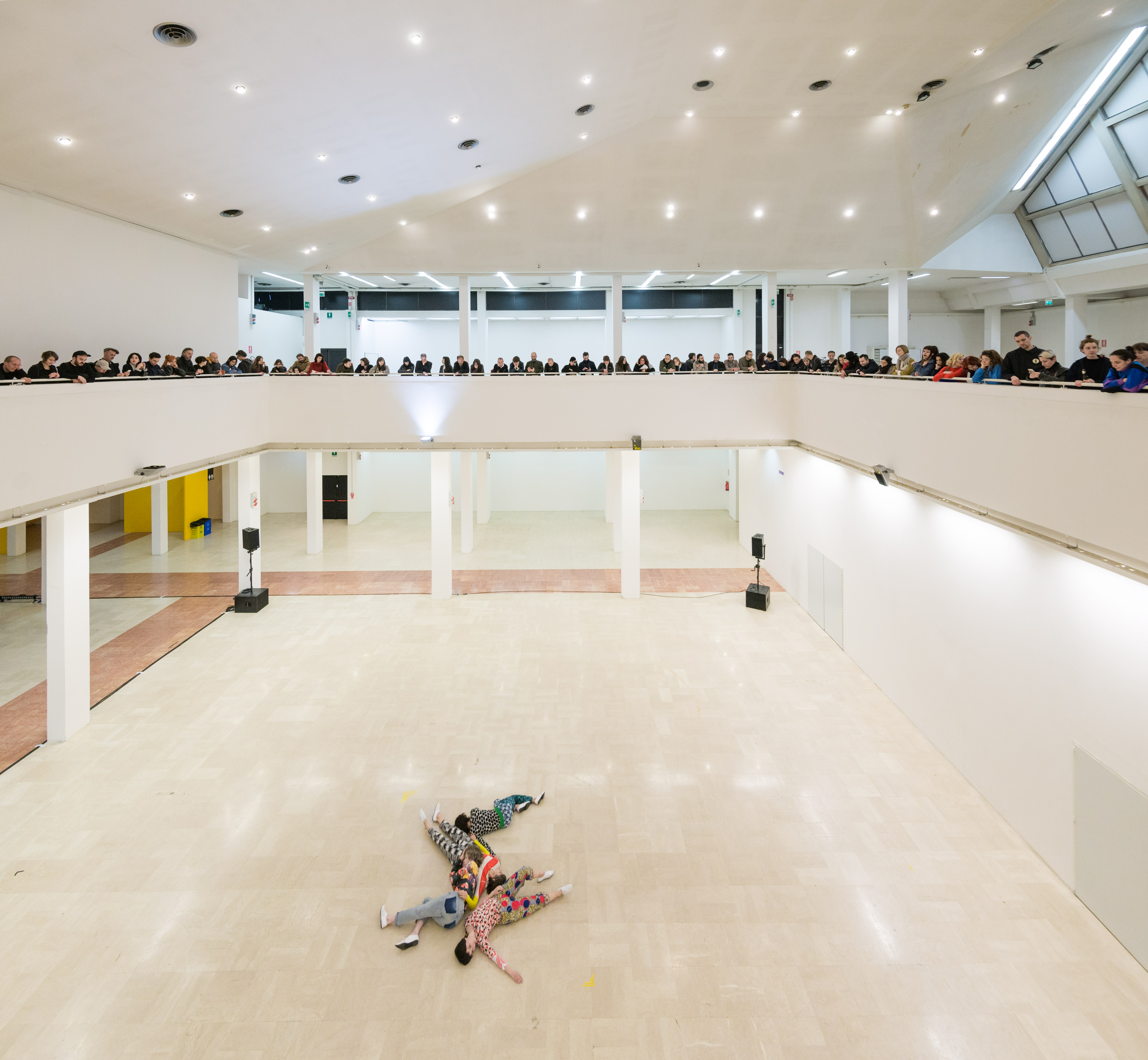
- Live Arts Week VI, 2017 - Ex GAM Bologna
- Genre: live arts
- Location: Bologna
- Organizer: Xing
- Website: www.liveartsweek.it

Live Arts Week is a project by Xing, born in 2012 out the fusion of the experiences of the two Bologna festivals (2000>2011): Netmage - International Live Media Festival and F.I.S.Co. - Festival Internazionale sullo Spettacolo Contemporaneo. Live Arts Week takes place in Bologna, Italy, once a year, and it is developed throughout one week in different locations and settings in town.

== Mission ==
Event dedicated to live arts, it hosts a blend of artworks and productions that revolve around the presence, performance and perceptual experience of sounds and visions, with a program of live works (performances, environments, concerts, live media, expanded cinema) presented by important personalities in the international and contemporary research scene. The set-up suggests a citywide event, involving several spaces, organizations and institutions active in the field of contemporary arts in Bologna.

== History ==
=== Edition 2012 ===
Venues:
Palazzo Re Enzo • Teatro Duse • Spazio Carbonesi • Hotel Palace • Nowhere • Palazzo Pepoli - Museo della Storia di Bologna

Artists:

- Anne Juren (FR-AU)
- Antonia Baehr (DE)
- Blues Control (US)/Laraaji (US)
- Canedicoda(IT)/Mirko Rizzi (IT)
- Christine De Smedt (BE)
- Claudia Castellucci (IT)
- Cristina Rizzo (IT)/Lucia Amara (IT)
- Denis Tyfus (BE)/Vom Grill (BE)
- Floris Vanhoof (BE)
- Hartmut Geerken (DE)
- Hieroglyphic Being (US)
- Jan Ritsema (NL)
- Krõõt Juurak (EE)
- Luca Trevisani (IT)
- Luís Miguel Félix (PT)
- Marino Formenti (IT-AT)
- Orphan Fairytale (BE)
- Ottaven (IT)
- Robert Steijn (NL-AT)
- Salka Ardal Rosengren (SE)
- Saša Asentić (RS)
- Silvia Costa (IT)
- The Claw ( (US)
- Yannick Val Gesto (BE)/Roman Hiele (BE)
- Xavier Le Roy (FR/DE)
- Yves-Noël Genod (FR)
- Giovanni Anceschi (IT)
- Ben Rivers (GB)
- Mattin (ES)

=== Edition 2013 ===
Venues:
MAMbo - Museo d'Arte Moderna di Bologna • Cinema Lumière • Garage Pincio • Cassero

Artists:

- Alix Eynaudi (FR AU)
- Anne Juren/Marianne Baillot/Alix Eynaudi (FR/AU/BE/PL)
- Daniela Cattivelli (IT)
- Dmitry Paranyushkin (RU-DE)
- Dracula Lewis/Out4Pizza (IT/US)
- Elise Florenty/Marcel Türkowsky (FR/DE)
- Eszter Salamon/Christine De Smedt (DE/BE)
- Mårten Spångberg/Linnea Martinsson (SW)
- Goodiepal (DK)
- Helm (GB)
- Junko (JP)
- Lucio Capece (AR-DE)
- Muna Mussie (IT-BE)
- Nature Theater of Oklahoma (US)
- Pierre Huyghe (FR)
- Riccardo Benassi (IT)
- Rose Kallal/Joe DeNardo(CA/US)
- Sara Manente (IT-BE)
- Sun Araw(US)
- Tony Conrad (US)

=== Edition 2014 ===
Venues:
MAMbo - Museo d'Arte Moderna di Bologna • Cinema Lumière • Biblioteca Salaborsa

Artists:

- Aki Onda (US-JP)
- Barokthegreat (IT)
- Ben Rivers/Ben Russell (UK/US)
- Ben Vida (US)
- Canedicoda(IT)
- Daniel Löwenbrück (Raionbashi) (DE)
- Dora Garcia (ES)
- Doreen Kutzke (DE)
- Enrico Boccioletti (IT)
- Èlg (FR)
- Gaëlle Boucand (FR)
- Ken Jacobs (US)
- Marco Berrettini (CH)
- Maria Hassabi (US-CY)
- Mette Edvardsen (NO-BE)
- MSHR (US)
- Neil Beloufa (FR)
- Porter Ricks (Thomas Köner/Andy Mellwig) (DE/DE)
- Rashad Becker (SY-DE)

=== Edition 2015 ===
Venues:
Ex Ospedale dei Bastardini • MAMbo - Museo d'Arte Moderna di Bologna

Artists:

- Adrian Rew (US)
- Alessandro di Pietro (IT)
- Andrea Magnani (IT)
- Andrew Norman Wilson (US)
- Anne de Vries (NL)
- Anthony Pateras (AT-DE)
- Auto Italia (US/GB)
- Ben Vickers/Holly White (GB/GB)
- Canedicoda (IT)
- Carola Spadoni (IT-DE)
- Claudia Triozzi (FR-IT)
- David Horvitz (US)
- Enrico Boccioletti (IT)
- Francesco Cavaliere (IT-DE)
- Gábor Lázár (HU)
- Harm van den Dorpel (NL)
- Ilja Karilampi (ES-DE)
- Jaakko Pallasvuo (FI-DE)
- Jack Hauser/Satu Herrala/Sabina Holzer/Jeroen Peeters (AT/FI/AT/BE)
- Jennifer Chan (CA)
- Luciano Chessa (IT-US)
- MACON (FR)
- MK/Luca Trevisani/Franco Farinelli/Roberta Mosca/Sigourney Weaver/Lorenzo Bianchi Hoesch (IT)
- Marco Dal Pane (IT)
- Markus Öhrn (SE)
- Martin Kohout (CZ-DE)
- N.M.O. (Morten J Olsen/Rubén Patiño) (NO/ES)
- Ogino Knauss (IT-DE)
- Philip Corner (US)
- Riccardo Benassi (IT-DE)
- Roberto Fassone (IT)
- Salvatore Panu (IT)
- Seth Price (US)
- VA AA LR (Adam Asnan/Vasco Alves/Louie Rice) (GB/PT/GB)
- Valerio Tricoli (IT-DE)
- Vera Mantero & guests (PT)
- Xavier Le Roy (DE/FR)
- Yuri Pattison (IE)
- Z.B. Aids (FR)

=== Edition 2016 ===
Venue:
MAMbo - Museo d'Arte Moderna di Bologna

Artists:

- Alix Eynaudi
- Duppy Gun
- Florian Hecker
- Invernomuto
- Lamin Fofana
- Florian Hecker
- Marco Berrettini /* MELK PROD
- Minoru Sato
- Mårten Spångberg
- Primitive Art
- Sara Manente
- Trond Reinholdtsen
- Zapruder filmmakersgroup

=== Edition 2017 ===
Venues:
Ex GAM • Teatro Comunale di Bologna • Galleria P420 • LOCALEDUE • CAR DRDE • Tripla

Artists:

- Alexandra Bachzetsis (CH)
- Anastasia Ax (SE)/C. Spencer Yeh (TW)
- Antonija Livingstone (CA)/Claudia Hill (DE)
- Ashes Withyman Moore (CA)
- Carlos Casas (ES)
- Coro Alpino RC (IT)
- Costante Biz (IT)
- Cristina Kristal Rizzo (IT)
- Dana Michel (CA)
- Lorenzo Senni (IT)
- Luigi Ontani (IT)
- Margherita Morgantin (IT)/Martina Raponi (IT)
- Maria Hassabi (CY)
- Mattin (ES)/Miguel Prado (ES)
- Mette Edvardsen (NO-BL)
- Nico Vascellari (IT)
- Nicola Ratti (IT)
- Nicolás Lamas (PE)
- Olivier Kosta-Thèfaine (FR)
- Prurient (US)
- Silvia Costa (IT)
- Ulrich Krieger (DE)
- Valerio Tricoli (IT)

=== Edition 2018 ===
Venues:
Ex GAM • Padiglione Esprit Nouveau • MAMbo - Museo d'Arte Moderna di Bologna • Galleria P420 • LOCALEDUE • CAR DRDE • GALLERIAPIÙ • Tripla • Galleria De' Foscherari

Artists:

- Antonia Baehr/Latifa Laabissi/Nadia Lauro (DE/FR/FR)
- David Wampach (FR)
- Goodiepal & Pals (DK)
- Hannah Sawtell (GB)
- Julian Weber (DE)
- Krõõt Juurak (EE)
- Leandro Nerefuh/Libidiunga Cardoso/Cecilia Lisa Eliceche/Caetano (BR/GA)
- Liliana Moro (IT)
- Mark Fell & Drumming (GB/PT)
- Mark Fell & Justin F. Kennedy (GB/US)
- Mark Fell (GB)
- Mette Edvardsen(NL-BE)
- NO-PA PA-ON/Luciano Maggiore/Louie Rice (IT/GB)
- Paolo Bufalini/Filippo Cecconi (IT)
- Rian Treanor (GB)
- Rodrigo Sobarzo de Larraechea (CL-NL)

=== Edition 2019 ===
Venues:
Galleria P420 • Gelateria Sogni di Ghiaccio • Fontana Parco della Montagnola • Chiesa Evangelica Metodista • Palazzo Volpe • Pinacoteca di Bologna • Palazzo Pezzoli • Accademia di Belle Arti di Bologna • Cinema Modernissimo • Ex negozio materiale electrico Priori

Artists:

- Barokthegreat (IT)
- Billy Bultheel (BE-DE)
- Catherine Christer Hennix (SE-DE)
- Doro Bengala (IT)
- Ellen Arkbro (SE)/Marcus Pal (SE)
- Gelateria Sogni di Ghiaccio(Filippo Marzocchi/Mattia Pajè) & friends (Giovanni Rendina, Andrea Magnani, Daniele Guerrini) (IT)
- Marcelo Evelin/Demolition Incorporada (BR)
- Michele Rizzo (IT-NL)
- Simon Vincenzi (GB)
- Sorour Darabi (IR-FR)
- Stine Janvin (NO-DE)

=== Edition 2020 ===
Venues:
Bologna outdoors • LOCALEDUE • P420 • Accademia di Belle Arti di Bologna • Spazio Hera • FMAV Fondazione Modena Arti Visive • Palazzo Vizzani • Teatro Auditorium Manzoni • Ex Chiesa di San Mattia

Artists:

- YEAH YOU (Gustav Thomas and Elvin Brandhi) (GB)

Other invited artists (events cancelled due to COVID-19 pandemic):

- Jeong Geumhyung (KR)
- Katerina Andreou (GR/FR)
- Mette Edvardsen/Matteo Fargion (NO/BL/GB)
- Riccardo Benassi (IT)
- Onyx Ashanti (USA)
- Graham Lambkin (GB)
- Yasmine Hugonnet (CH)
- Canedicoda (IT)
- Cristina Kristal Rizzo/Charlie Laban Trier (IT/DK/NL)

=== Edition 2021 ===
Venues:
Lungo Reno Quartiere Barca • Orti Comunali Boschetto

Artists:

- Alessandro Di Pietro
- Alessandro Rilletti
- Alix Eynaudi
- Andrea Dionisi
- Andrea Magnani
- Annamaria Ajmone
- Anne Faucheret
- Attila Faravelli
- Biagio Caravano
- Bianca R. Schroeder
- Canedicoda
- Carolina Fanti
- Caterina Montanari
- Chiara Lucisano
- Christophe Albertijn
- Costanza Candeloro
- Cristina Kristal Rizzo
- Edoardo Ciaralli
- Elena Radice
- Eleonora Luccarini
- Enrico Gilardi
- Enrico Malatesta
- Francesca Duranti
- Francesca Ugolini
- Francesco Cavaliere
- g. olmo stuppia
- Gina Monaco
- Gitte Hendrikx
- Giuseppe Vincent Giampino
- Guillermo De Cabanyes
- Invernomuto
- Isabella Mongelli
- Jacopo Benassi
- Kinkaleri
- Laura Pante
- Lele Marcojanni
- Loredana Tarnovschi
- Lucia Amara
- Marco Mazzoni
- Marcos Simoes
- Margherita Morgantin
- Massimo Conti
- Mattia Paje
- Michele Di Stefano
- Michele Lori
- Michele Rizzo
- Milena Rossignoli
- mk
- Muna Mussie
- Nicola Ratti
- Paolo Bufalini
- Renato Grieco
- Roberta Mosca
- Roberta Pagani
- Sara Manente
- Sebastiano Geronimo
- Standards
- Virginia Genta
- Vittoria Caneva
- Zapruder

== See also ==
- Performing arts
- Performance art
- Sound Art
- Expanded Cinema
- Happening
- Experimental music

== External sources ==
- Xing Official Website
- "Polisingularity Universe". Nero. 11 April 2013.
- "A thousand platforms". Domus. 2 May 2013.
- "A proposito del Live Arts Week". ATP Diary. 13 April 2013.
- Granato, Paola (16 April 2018). "La Forma della Performance". Exibart.
- Gatti, Tommaso (April 2018). "Live arts week Bologna". FLASHART.
- "Here it is Elsewhere". Nero. 24 April 2019.
