= Institute for Applied Theatre Studies =

Department of Justus Liebig University Gießen in Germany

The Institute for Applied Theatre Studies (Angewandte Theaterwissenschaft, ATW) is part of the Justus Liebig University Gießen. It offers three different degree programs: a three-year Bachelor's program, Applied Theatre Studies, and two two-year Master's programs, Applied Theatre Studies and Choreography and Performance (CuP). Each course places equal importance on academic and artistic practice. In seminars, reading courses and tutorials, students asked to engage with theoretical issues, while in performance projects, practical courses and workshops they experiment with different artistic approaches. Courses in the humanities and cultural studies offered by the university are also incorporated into each program. In choreography and performance, certain practical classes are organized in cooperation with the Frankfurt University of Music and Performing Arts (Hochschule für Musik und darstellende Kunst, Frankfurt am Main), where these classes will also be held.

== History ==
=== The Formative Years ===
Established in 1982, the Institute for Applied Theatre Studies became the first University program that integrated a study of artistic practice into the study of theatre. Under the leadership of Andrzej Wirth and his collaborator Hans-Thies Lehmann, the institute quickly developed into an alternative to those established theatre schools that understood theatre exclusively as acting based on dramas and prepared their students for a market dominated by the well-established municipal theatres. In addition, the institute stood in opposition to other academic departments for theatre studies, where there was little interest in practice. There, the discipline was understood primarily as theatre historiography.

Wirth and a variety of guest professors including Heiner Müller, George Tabori, Emma Lewis Thomas, John Jesurun and Robert Wilson sought out new forms of theatre, that challenged the orthodoxies of the German-speaking theatre scene in terms of its understanding of theatre. Influenced by Wirth and his choice of guest professors, some of the early works by students dealt with the tradition of Brecht's „Lehrstücke“, minimalist tendencies springing from the fine arts and the contemporary works of groups like The Wooster Group, Baktruppen, Needcompany and artists like Jan Fabre, John Cage and William Forsythe. Simultaneously, Lehmann worked on the theory of these new approaches to theatre, that could not be conceived within the theory of performance and acting that was dominant at the time. Due to Lehmann's influential work and his scientific masterpiece with the same title, these forms of theatre are today known as postdramatic theatre.

=== The 1990s and 2000s ===
In the 1990s, the theatre studies scholar Helga Finter and the composer and director Heiner Goebbels took over the scientific and artistic leadership of the institute. Goebbels extended the scope of the artistic teachings to include more contemporary media-related forms of presentation and productions that would come to include music, sound and light. Further, with the completion of sound and video studios, a platform for independent work with these new media forms was established. Academically, Finter developed new areas of study by delving into the theatricality of the literary and theatrical experiments of the historical avant-garde, in particular those of Antonin Artaud, Russian and Italian Futurism, as well as the Situationist International. The works of Robert Wilson (director) and other contemporary directors and artists such as Peter Brook, Klaus Michael Grüber were among Finter's objects of study, and led to her theory of theatre that described it as a place of negotiation for subjectivity that contrasted a continuously solidifying society of spectacle (Guy Debord). Within the context of the university but also the theater scene of the 1990s and 2000s, the reputation of the institute also was to reconsider and emphasise the unique qualities of theatre by applying poststructuralist studies and the theories of thinkers including Roland Barthes, Jacques Derrida, Michel Foucault, Gilles Deleuze and Jean-François Lyotard. The tradition of guest professors continues to this day and continues to exert an important influence on the institute. Participating artists and scholars invited have included Marina Abramović, Eugenio Barba, Jérôme Bel, Herbert Blau, Claudia Bosse, Richard Foreman, Rabih Mroué, Mathilde Monnier, Patrice Pavis, Richard Schechner, Georg Seeßlen, Tino Sehgal and Samuel Weber,

In 2008 the MA Choreography and Performance and a professorship for dance studies with a focal point on choreography and performance were established. Already in the 1990s, during Gabrielle Brandstetter’s stay at the institute, a strong focus on contemporary forms of dance had been instigated. Setting up this new MA program then represented a further opening of the institute towards contemporary dance and choreography. This program is organized in cooperation with the department for contemporary dance at the Frankfurt University of Music and Performing Arts. In the early years of the program, it was supervised by Gerald Siegmund. Similar to the already existing Bachelor and Master program Applied Theatre Studies, the MA Choreography and Performance offers both an academic and artistic approach, though with a particular focus on the body, its movement, its politics and economics.

=== The Institute today ===
Today there are four chairs at the Institute for Applied Theatre Studies, three of which are held permanently. Currently, Xavier Le Roy holds the chair in artistic practice, Gerald Siegmund holds the chair in theatre studies and has been managing director of the Institute since 2011. Bojana Kunst has held the chair in dance studies since 2012. The fourth chair is designed for the guest professorships and is thus held by different artists over the course of a year. Whereas in the 1980s and 1990s, the conventional definitions and practices of theatre necessitated more innovative forms of teaching and understanding of theatre. Today the decline of the artistic importance of the municipal theatres and the enormous changes in the theatre landscape have brought other discussions to the fore: the ambivalences in the independent theatre scenes, its internationalisation and its working conditions due to the intensification of economic pressures produce new challenges and problems for the production but also for the aesthetics of contemporary theatre.

The Institute for Applied Theatre Studies thrives on a proactive student body. For many years, students have independently organized a number of festivals: the Theatermaschine, a platform for the presentation of students‘ own works and the Diskurs festival, first founded in 1982 by, a noted international festival for the performing arts. For this festival, artists are invited with their works to participate in discourse and discussion; and finally the relatively young Instant-festival, which seeks to further the exchange with a program called The Scenic Arts at the University Hildesheim. This festival is hosted alternately in Gießen and Hildesheim. All festivals, but also the presentation of performance projects and practical courses, include critical discussions. These allow for an exchange between the students over their own practice and that characterizes the institute's culture of discussion.

=== Alumni ===
Alumni of the Institute for Applied Theatre Studies work in diverse fields of dance, theatre and performance, fine arts, media and academia. For more than 30 years, graduates continue to leave a lasting impression, both in the municipal theatre scene, the independent theatre scene and even in the academic world. Réne Pollesch, Gob Squad, She She Pop, Rimini Protokoll, Showcase Beat Le Mot, Otmar Wagner, Thomas Martius, Jürgen Fritz, Monster Truck, Auftrag : Lorey and many more have had a lasting impact on the theatre scene with their non-hierarchical and collective methods and unique aesthetics. Miriam Dreysse, Jens Roselt, Annemarie Matzke, André Eiermann and Jörn Etzold work in theatre departments across the German-speaking world, Frank Hentschker and Markus Wessendorf at American universities, all formulating new analytical approaches and theories of contemporary theatre.

== Sources ==
- Institute for Applied Theatre Studies Official website
- Das Buch von der Angewandten Theaterwissenschaft, editors Annemarie Matzke, Christel Weiler and Isa Wortelkamp, Alexander Verlag Berlin, 2012
