= Rimini Protokoll =

German group of theatre artists

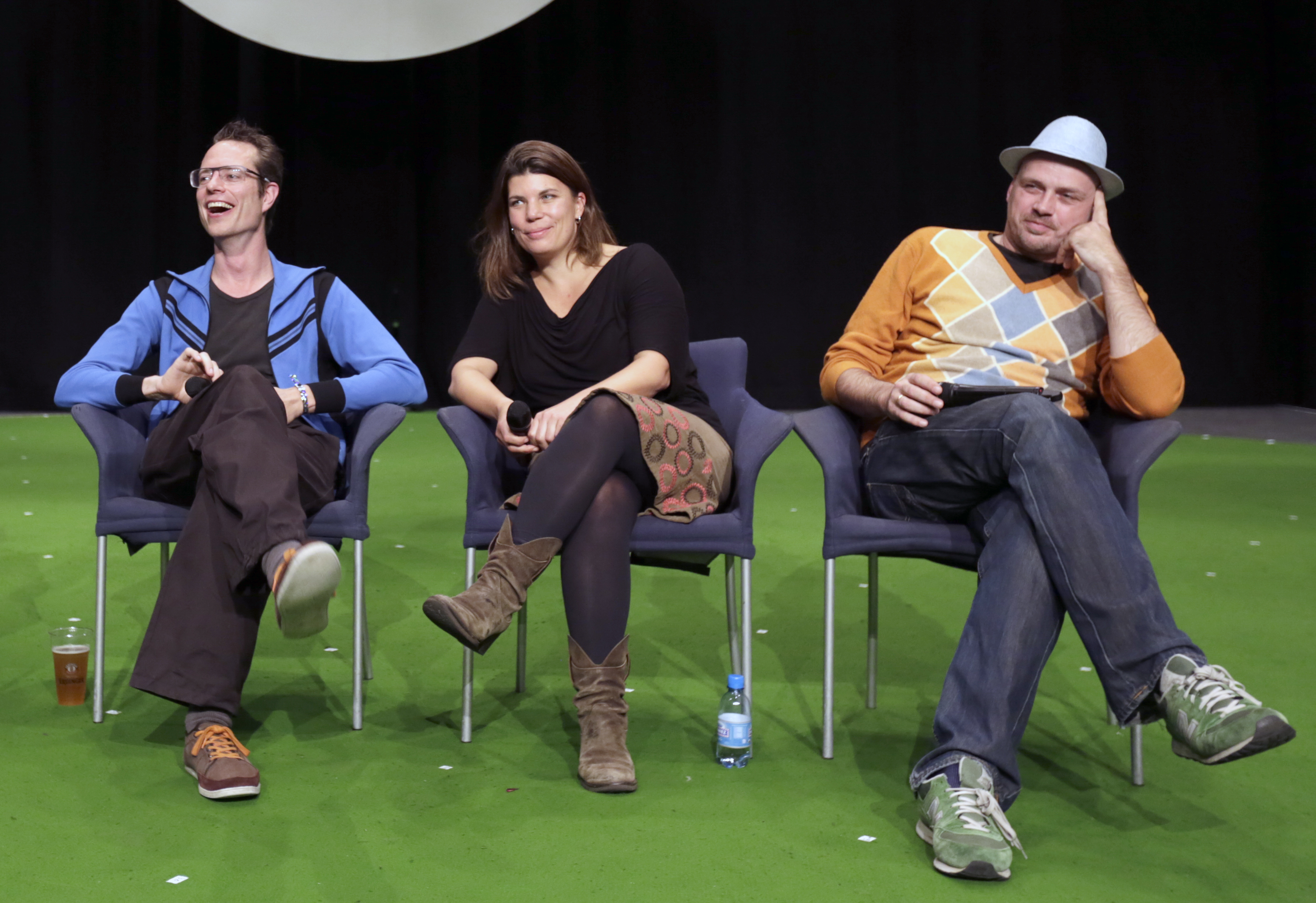
- Rimini Protokoll in 2012
- Formation: 2000
- Type: Theatre group
- Location: Berlin
- Members: Helgard Haug; Stefan Kaegi; Daniel Wetzel
- Website: rimini-protokoll.de

Rimini Protokoll is a German theatre group founded in 2000 by Helgard Haug, Stefan Kaegi, and Daniel Wetzel. They create stage plays, interventions, scenic installations, and radio plays. Many of their works are characterized by interactivity and a playful use of technology.

== Methods and organization ==
Rimini Protokoll is a collaboration between the artists Helgard Haug, Stefan Kaegi, and Daniel Wetzel. The three met while attending the Institute for Applied Theatre Studies at the University of Giessen in Germany. They are a team of authors, directors, and designers of sound, stage, and videos, who have been working together since 1999.

A few characteristics typically apply to Rimini Protokoll productions:

- the group works as an artist collective, sometimes including all of them, sometimes only one or two, sometimes collaborating with "outsiders". They use the name Rimini Protokoll as a common and recognizable label for their productions.
- organization around a protocol rather than a dramatic text, meaning a script that has been developed in rehearsals cooperatively and sets a loose framework for the performance
- Rimini Protokoll usually work with people they call "experts of the everyday". This expertise is not associated with theatre, such as acting skills, but rather with a 'real life' competence or a profession that has shaped them Examples include truckers, secret service agents, model train enthusiasts, police officers, etc. These people convey their experiences, stories, clothes, accents, and even specific habitual movements onstage. This is seen as a key element of Rimini Protokoll's "new documentary theatre".
- use of media technology
- staging productions in representative locations or extending the stage to public spaces

== Awards and recognition ==
- 2007 — Mülheimer Dramatikerpreis award, for their stage play Karl Marx: Das Kapital, Erster Band
- 2007 — Der Faust award in the "Sonderpreis" category
- 2008 — Europe Theatre Prize – Thessaloniki
- 2008 — Hörspielpreis der Kriegsblinden prize, for their radio play Karl Marx: Das Kapital, Erster Band
- 2011 — Silver Lion at the 2011 Theatre Biennale in Venice
- 2013 — Japan Media Arts Festival Excellence Award for Situation Rooms
- 2015 — Hans-Reinhart-Ring

Rimini Protokoll have several times been invited to the "10 best" of the theatre festival Berliner Theatertreffen, most recently with "All right. Good night." (2022) and "Chinchilla Arsehole, eyeye" (2020).

== Literature and video ==
=== Literature ===
- Schipper, Imanuel and Helgard Haug, Stefan Kaegi, Daniel Wetzel. Rimini Protokoll 2000–2020. English, hardcover, 2,000 photographs, excerpts from more than 80 works. Cologne: Verlag der Buchhandlung Walter und Franz Koenig, 2021. ISBN 978-3-7533-0048-1
- Rimini Protokoll: Situation Rooms Program book in English (PDF download)
- Gomila, Andreu: Rimini Protokoll, escultors del temps / Sculptors of Time, Barcelona, Editions CCCB vol.105, 2021 ISBN 978-84-09-31912-1
- Malzacher, Florian and Miriam Dreysse. Experts of the Everyday: The Theatre of Rimini Protokoll. Alexander Verlag, Berlin 2008. ISBN 978-3-89581-187-6
- Deiters, Franz-Josef. Vielleicht 'Ins Licht rücken? Oder 'Türen öffnen''. Rimini Protokolls Theater des Alltags. In: Franz-Josef Deiters: Neues Welttheater?: Zur Mediologie des Theaters der Neo-Avantgarden. Erich Schmidt Verlag, Berlin 2022, pp. 21–54. ISBN 978-3-503-20998-9 (print); ISBN 978-3-503-20999-6 (ebook)

=== Video portraits ===
- John Paul Tansey: The Making of 100% Melbourne, Melbourne 2012
- Imanuel Schipper in conversation with Rimini Protokoll, reART:theURBAN by ARCH+, Zurich, Gessnerallee, 25–27 October 2012
- Oktavian Saiu in dialogue with Rimini Protokoll on the occasion of the Romanian version of The Walks, Teatrelli online, 2021
- Rimini Protokoll, Dominik Huber, Andreu Gomila: Theatre Beyond Its Boundaries. A conversation coinciding with the opening of Rimini Protokoll's Urban Nature, Barcelona, CCCB, 1 July 2021.
- Andreu Gomila: There is not such a big difference between the audience and us, A portrait of Rimini Protokoll, Barcelona 2021
