= Darren O'Donnell =

Canadian actor

- Born: September 12, 1965 (age 60); Edmonton, Alberta, Canada
- Notable work: A Suicide-Site Guide to the City; White Mice; Who Shot Jacques Lacan?; Radio Rooster Says That's Bad; Over; [boxhead]; pppeeeaaaccceee; All the Sex I've Ever Had; Haircuts by Children; The Children's Choice Awards; Eat the Street; Nightwalks with Teenagers; Your Secrets Sleep With Me; Social Acupuncture: A Guide to Suicide, Performance and Utopia; Haircuts by Children and Other Evidence for a New Social Contract; Teentalitarianism; Bespiel Mal Bochum
- Awards: Pauline MacGibbon Award (2000); Gabriel award for excellence in broadcasting (2000); Canadian Coalition for the Rights of Children Award (2012)

Darren O'Donnell (born 1965) is a Canadian novelist, essayist, performance artist, playwright, director, actor and urban planner.

He is the artistic director of the Mammalian Diving Reflex theatre company, has written many plays including A Suicide-Site Guide to the City, White Mice, Who Shot Jacques Lacan?, Radio Rooster Says That's Bad, Over, [boxhead] and pppeeeaaaccceee, and has published one novel entitled Your Secrets Sleep With Me. In addition to the novel, he has published five other books with Coach House Books: Inoculations, pppeeeaaaccceee, Social Acupuncture, [boxhead] and Haircuts by Children and Other Evidence for a New Social Contract.

O'Donnell holds a M.Sc. in Urban Planning from the University of Toronto (2014) and a B.F.A in Acting from the University of Alberta (1988).

== Performances and published works ==
Social Acupuncture is both the title of his book and a wing of Mammalian Diving Reflex where O'Donnell creates work that engages the public and claims to prove the "generosity, abundance and power of the social sphere." The book is an extended essay outlining the possibility for a civically engaged artistic practice as well as an in-depth description and analysis of his work in this field. Social Acupuncture projects include The Talking Creature, Home Tours, Q&A Slow Dance with Teacher, Parkdale Public School vs. Queen West, and Haircuts by Children. With Haircuts by Children O'Donnell worked with a grade 5/6 class at Parkdale Public School in Toronto and Luther Burbank School in Los Angeles, trained them and provided free haircuts to the public by 10-year-olds. During Toronto's 2006 inaugural Nuit Blanche, an all-night art event, he presented Ballroom Dancing, a dance-party DJ'd by ten-year-olds in a gymnasium filled with thousands of rubber balls. In the 2007 Nuit Blanche he presented Slow Dance with Teacher, an event that offered the opportunity for the public to have a slow dance with university professors and high school teachers. His company, Mammalian Diving Reflex, is the resident art company at Toronto's Parkdale Public School and has created a series of events entitled Parkdale Public School vs. Queen West that brought children together with artists, the public, businesses and cultural institutions along Toronto's rapidly gentrifying Queen Street West. As of March 1, 2013, Mammalian Diving Reflex is the Company in Residence at the Gladstone Hotel, a boutique hotel in Toronto's West Queen West gallery district.

O'Donnell has collaborated with other artists across Canada including Karen Hines, Daniel MacIvor and da da Kamera, One Yellow Rabbit, Rumble Productions, Theatre Replacement, Instant Coffee, Alberta Theatre Projects, Theatre Passe Muraille, Go Chicken Go, Factory Theatre, the Theatre Centre and Downstage Theatre.

His writing has appeared in Pivot, Material, One Hour Empire, GreenTOpia, Public Access, the Canadian Theatre Review, Daily News and Analysis India, Descant, C Magazine, uTOpia and The New Quarterly.

=== Production credits ===
O'Donnell's works and Mammalian Diving Reflex has been presented globally, including The Theatre Centre (Toronto, 1998 and 2010), the Theatre Passe Muraille (Toronto, 2000, 2002 and 2003), High Performance Rodeo (Calgary, 2002), The PuSh International Performing Arts Festival (Vancouver, 2004, 2005, 2008 and 2009), The Toronto Free Gallery (Toronto, 2004, 2008 and 2009), Buddies in Bad Times Theatre (Toronto, 2004, 2007 and 2008), Latitude 53 (Edmonton, 2004), The Dollar Store Show (Chicago, 2005), Alberta Theatre Projects (Calgary, 2005 and 2006), Outpost for Contemporary Art (Los Angeles, 2006), Dublin Fringe Festival (2007), Performa (New York, 2007), World Performing Arts Festival (Lahore, 2007, Fierce Festival (Birmingham UK, 2007 and 2014), Portland Institute for Contemporary Art (Portland, 2007 and 2014), F.I.S.Co. (Bologna, 2008), Melbourne Festival (2008), Sydney Festival (2008), Es Terni (Terni, 2008), Context Gallery (Derry, 2009), Uovo (Milan, 2009), Midsummer Festival (Cork, 2009 and 2013), Weatherspoon Museum (Greensboro, 2009), Les Escales Improbables (Montreal, 2008); Gallery B312 (Montreal, 2009), Context (Brisbane, 2010), West Kowloon Cultural District (Hong Kong, 2010), London International Festival of Theatre (2010), Fusebox (Austin, 2011), Kustenfestivaldesart (Brussels, 2011), Auawirleben (Bern, 2012), Darwin Festival (2012), Fidena (Bochum, 2014), and Liveart.dk (Copenhagen, 2014).

=== Awards ===
He was the 2000 recipient of the Pauline MacGibbon Award for directors, and has also been nominated for several Dora Awards for his writing, directing, and acting. He has won one of these awards for design. He also received a 2000 Gabriel award for excellence in broadcasting with his CBC piece Crazy Like a Fox. His Mammalian Protocol for Collaborating with Children was awarded the 2012 Canadian Coalition for the Rights of Children Award.
