= Netmage =

Electronic art festival

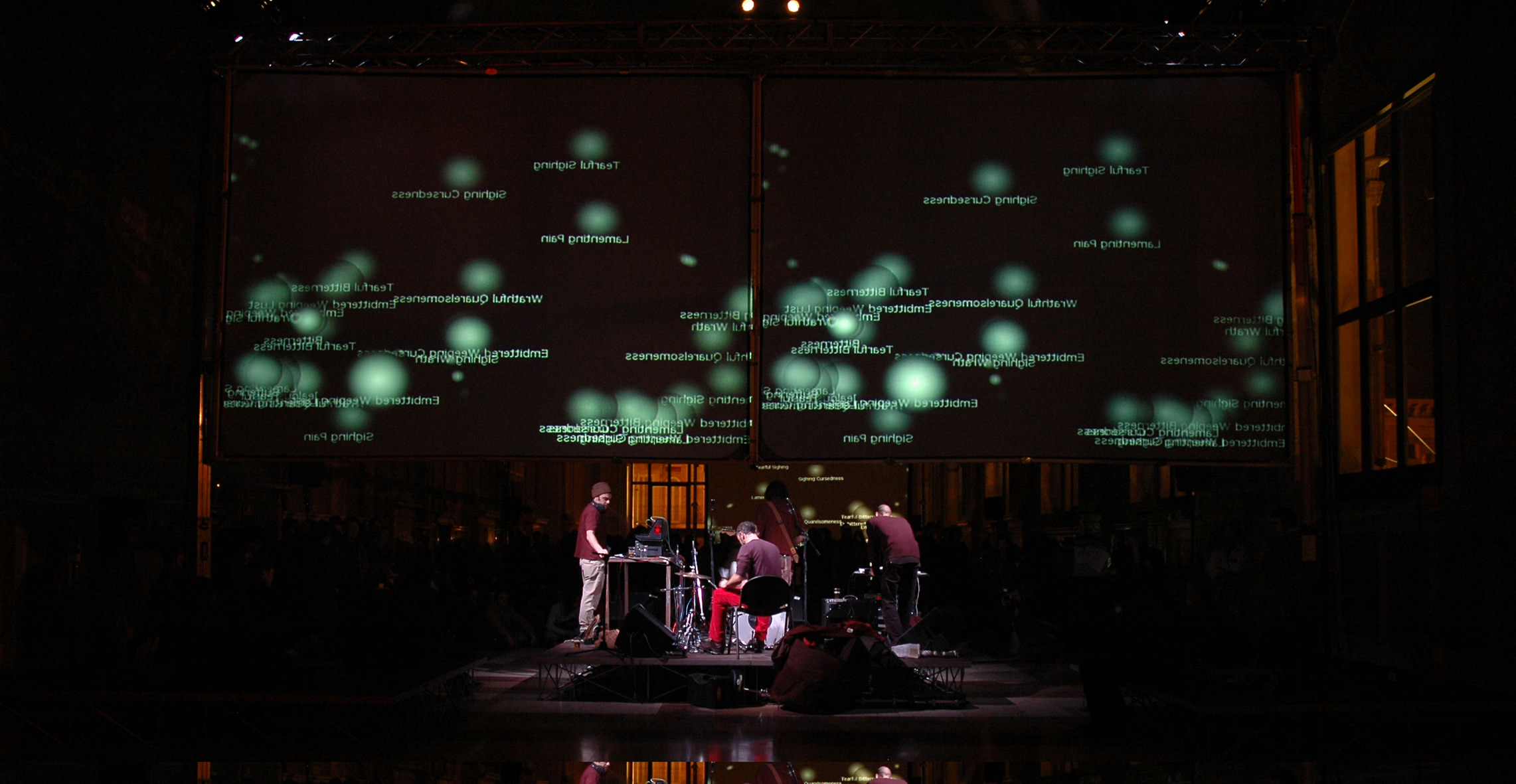
- Sinistri, Simionato & Donnachie - The Single Unit of Beauty - Netmage 06, 2006
- Genre: Electronic music
- Location: Bologna, Italy
- Years active: 2000–2011
- Founders: XING
- Website: www.netmage.it

Netmage is an international festival dedicated to electronic art curated by Xing and produced annually—in the city of Bologna—as a multidisciplinary program of works, investigating and promoting contemporary audiovisual research. The festival was born in 2000 with funds provided by the European Union, when Bologna represented one of the nine major European capital of culture. The festival concentrates on an amalgam of Happenings, environments, and audio/visual installations, it does through a concentration on creative scenes and subcultural communities.

The experience of Netmage (eleven editions from 2001 to 2011) was merged into the annual Live Arts Week.

== Mission ==
The mission of Netmage is to investigate the relationship between the "liveness" and the "ambient space". At the crossroads of these two terms is situated the notion of "post-cinema": defined as an environmental construction capable of gathering widely diverse attitudes in a public space. Post Cinema/Postmemory It is a cinema made of multi-projections on a number of screens with no seating, a multiplication of narrative traces, possible points of view, physical positions of the spectators; achieving a removal of the forced estrangement of the 20th Century spectator (the darkness of the room, physical and perceptive isolation, a monodirectional viewing perspective) that evoke the world of the first Happenings of the 1960s, the philosophy of expanded cinema, and successive multimedia installation experiments of the 1980s.

== "Live Media" ==
"Live Media is an open-ended term which has come into currency amongst artists and theoreticians. Live-media relates to the gathering of relatively diverse practices capable of calling to mind the wide range of research by video producers, visual artists, musicians, sound artists, VJ's, filmmakers, designers and a range of creative people issued by creative scenes and subcultural communities. Netmage and its curators have been instrumental in coining and promoting this term.

- utilization of electronic, digital or analogue platforms to generate images and sound;
- interaction consisting of visual and audio elements;
- inclusion of liveness (or randomness) as in any kind of performance.

Playing with stimuli, what is created in the live-media experience is a "privilege of variation" that in the first case goes from designer to public, in the second from public to executor. The confrontation is direct, dictated by the logic of the event.

"Dispositif" (post-cinema) and practice (Live Media) thus represent two types of continuous variation through which Netmage questions possible currents in new media aesthetics, summoning artists and visual operators from diverse disciplines, in a context reminiscent of the Happening.

Despite the complexity born from the exploration of this kind of space, ideal internal space, the two axes—post-cinema and live media—intertwine and simply state what may be called a gathering, a togetherness of the community of producers, protagonists in the field of contemporary media, who both find themselves isolated; creating then a direct, interdisciplinary confrontation, thus filling a growing gap between hyper-connectivity on one hand, physical and social experience on the other.

== History ==
The first edition of the festival was born in an historic watershed with a view on one side from the experiences of one of the last bastions of the Twentieth Century avantgarde, video art, and on the other toward a new front that was as yet undefined while the entire world of research visual production was poised to turn fully digital.

In the field of music, the 1990s had already anticipated a great deal of what was later to come in the visual world, pointing the way to a radical transformation in techniques, languages and methods of cultural consumption. Netmage, different from a number of other festivals dedicated to electronics born in the world of clubbing, has concentrated on the production of images, imagination and universal vision. In eleven editions Netmage has produced and hosted over two hundred projects from over thirty countries (including Europe, Asia, The Americas, Oceania) offering a smattering of the most recent evolutions in the technological imagination and multiple currents. Follows the list of the guests of the festival (Nationality follows standard notation)

=== Netmage 2001 ===
Venues:
Link • Hangar del mercato Ortofrutticolo • Teatro Testoni • Rifugio Antiaereo Giardini del Guasto • Salara • Ex Scuderie di Palazzo Paleotti

Artists:

- Yann Beauvais/Thomas Köner (FR/DE) Quatr'un
- Alexander Hahn(US) Memory of Present
- Granular synthesis (AU) POL
- Studio Azzurro (IT) Landing Talk
- Romeo Castellucci (IT) Mene Tekel Peres
- Umberto Bignardi/Alvin Curran (IT) Ritorno alla città
- Kinkaleri (IT) Esso
- Pansonic (FI)
- Cold Cut/Hexstatic (GB) Vision Live
- Mika Vainio (FI)
- Jurgen Reble (DE)

=== Netmage 2002 ===
Venue:
Scuderie Bentivoglio

Artists:

- Reel Crew/Dj Seam (GB)
- Mordka/ Jake Mandell (US)
- Visual Kitchen Vsw/Styrofoam (BE)
- Sun Wu-Kung (IT)
- Lleuchtmittell (II_II)/Bernd Karner (DE)
- Visomat Inc./Dj Shake (DE)
- Norscq presented by Batofar-Paris (FR)
- Ogino Knauss (IT)
- Karø Goldt/Rashim (AT)
- VDJ Safy Sniper (DE/IL)
- Qubo Gas (FR)
- J-Star screening by Onedotzero (GB)
- Farmers manual (AT)
- Dat Politics presented by Batofar-Paris (FR)
- Mouts (IT) Room 101

=== Netmage 2003 ===
Venues:
Hangar dlF • Raum • Teatro San Leonardo

Artists:

- Tim Etchells (Forced Entertainment) (UK) DownTime, Taxonomy(Death Stories), Everything
- Christian Fennesz/Claudio Sinatti (AU/IT) Far From Here
- Cane Capovolto (IT) Stereo #1
- Otolab (IT)
- Mikomikona (DE)
- Mordka (US)
- Monitor Automatique (DE)
- Teatrino Clandestino (IT) Prima l'immagine e poi il titolo
- Superstereo/BHF feat. Patrick Tuttofuoco
- n:ja/Dietmar Schwarzler
- D-Fuse (DE) Gravity
- Bas Van Koolwijk (NL)
- KMH (DE)
- Ogino Knauss (IT)
- Semiconductor (UK)
- General Magic & Pita Feat. Tina Frank
- Qubo Gas/Scratch Pet Land Baover (FR) Tit
- Tarwater
- Jollymusic

=== Netmage 2004 ===
Venues:
Sala Borsa • Raum • Cassero

Artists:

- The Users (CA)
- Alex Adriaansens (NL) V2
- Mylicon/EN/Domenico Sciajno (IT)
- Skoltz_Kolgen (CA)
- Kim Cascone (US)
- Z_e_l_l_e (Nicola Catalano/Maurizio Martusciello) (IT)
- Radian (AT)
- Fanny & Alexander/Zapruder Filmmakersgroup (IT) Villa Venus (il giardino delle delizie)
- Mille Rechenzentrum (DE) Rechenzentrum
- Strohmann /Bruckmayer/Jade (AT)
- Mugen (Alessandro Canova) (IT)
- Richard Chartier (US)
- Saule (BE)
- Wang Inc./Saul Saguatti (IT) Woods Roads
- Thomas Koner (DE) Banlieue du video
- Philippe Petit (FR)
- Tonne (FR/UK) Soundtoys
- Hanna Kuts/Viktor Dovhalyuk (DE) Akuvido
- Otolab (IT)
- Scanner (UK) 52 Pages
- Thomas Koner/Asmus Tietchens (DE) Kontakt der Junglinge
- Mou, Lips! (IT)
- Tatiana, GGTarantola, BO130, Unz, Microbo, Dario Panzeri, Matteo Mariano (IT) Un'impurità non calcolata
- Tonne (UK)
- Teamtendo (FR)
- Little Fluffy Luke (Gianluca Tinarelli) (IT)
- Francesco del Garda (IT)
- Emmanuel Gonay/Xavier Garcia-Bardon

=== Netmage 2005 ===
Venues:
Auditorium Teatro Manzoni • Galleria Accursio • Cassero

Artists:

- Dmitry Gelfand/EvelinaDomnich (RU/US) Cemra Lucida
- [sic]/triPhaze (Jen Morris/Marek Brandt) (CA/DE) Organic Debris
- Greg Davies/Sebastien Roux/Mattia Casalegno (US/FR/IT) Grain Scape (by no.signal)
- Vincent Epplay/Antoine Schmitt (FR/DE) Display Pixel
- Oren Ambarchi/Jon Wozencroft (AU/UK)
- Staalplaat SoundSystem(NL/DE) Yokomono
- Antiopic(US)
- Patrick Fontana/Emeric Aelters/Pierre Ives Fave(FR) Grenze
- Anthony Pateras/Robin Fox (AT)
- Phil Niblock/Thomas Ankersmit (US/NL) (no.signall)
- Pirandelo (Claudio Sinatti) Andrea Gabriele/Marita Cosima) (IT)
- Carlos Giffoni (US)
- Ateleia (james Elliot)/Sadek Bazaraa (US)
- Scape-Berlin
- Ogino Knauss (IT)
- Bas Van Koolwijk/Christian Toonk (NL) RGB
- Jan Jelinek/Karl Kliem (DE) Sound and Images
- Monolake/Deadbeat (DE/CA) Atlant Waves
- Pierpaolo Leo/Claudio Sinatti (IT)
- Ellen Alien (DE)
- Will Guthrie (AUS)

=== Netmage 2006 ===
Venue:
Palazzo Re Enzo

Artists:

- Nico Vascellari/With Love (IT) A Great Circle #6
- Katherine Liberovskaya/o.blaat (CA/US)
- Molair/Avatam (FR)
- Sinistri++/Andy Simionato & karen Ann Donnachie (IT/AT) The single Unit of Beauty.
- Electric Indigo (AT)
- Qubo Gas (FR) Baover tit
- Cineplexx(Sebastian Litmanovich)/Abe(Alex Beltran) (AR/ES)
- Ministry of Defiance (David Handford) (UK)
- Andrea Dojmi/Port Royal (IT) Education and protection of our children #2
- Arto Lindsay/Dominique Gonzalez Foerster (US/FR) Ipanema Théories
- @c/Lia (PT/AT)
- Boris Debackere/Brecht Debackere (B/NL) Rotor
- Pierpaolo Leo/Claudio Sinatti (IT)
- Carsten Nicolai (DE)
- Lee Van Dowski (CH)
- Remute (DE)
- Ferran Fages/Will Guthrie/Jean-Philippe Gross (ES/AU/FR)
- Arto Lindsay (US) Garden of self regard
- Kurt Hentschläger (AT) Feed
- Carola Spadoni/Zu (IT) Live Through This
- Simone Tosca (IT) Ear
- ZimmerFrei (IT) Study for a portrait

=== Netmage 2007 ===
Venues:
Palazzo Re Enzo • Cinema Arcobaleno • ArteFiera - Art Cafè (Hall 19) • Teatro Anatomico – Biblioteca Ariostea - Ferrara

Artists:

- kinkaleri (IT) Uh!
- Onda/Oren Ambarchi/Alan Licht (JP/AU/US) Cinemage
- John Duncan/Leif Elggren (US/SE) Something Like Seeing In The Dark
- Emiliano Montanari, David Lynch, Angelo Badalamenti, Trentemøller feat. DJ T.O.M., Enrico Ghezzi, Asja Bettin, and shortcircuits with Thomas Pynchon, Paul Virilio, Hideo Kojima Eyerophany
- Studio Brutus/Citrullo Int./Taxonomy (IT) H2O
- Kjersti Sundland/Anne Bang-Steinsvik (NO) Monstrous Little Women
- Carlos Casas/Sebastian Escofet (ES/AR) Siberian Fieldworks (Fieldworks#10)
- Charles Atlas/Chris Peck (US) The Intensity Police Are Working My Last Gay Nerve
- Milanese(Stephen Whetman) (UK) (by PDF)
- David Lynch (US) Inland Empire
- Invernomuto/Moira Ricci (IT) Bissera
- Opificio Ciclope/Egle Sommacal (IT) Rapsodia della Santa Muerte
- Armin Linke/Carl Michael von Hausswolff (IT/SE) Details
- Roberto Mendoza (MX)
- Glimpse (UK)
- Robert Babicz (DE)
- Will Guthrie (AU)
- Mattin (ES)
- Thomas Ankersmit (NL)
- Philip Jeck (UK)

=== Netmage 2008 ===
Venues:
Palazzo Re Enzo • Appartamento privato - Bologna • Piazza del Municipio - Ferrara

Artists:

- Visomat Inc./Errorsmith (DE) Halbzeug - Surface RefinementDerek
- Derek Holzer/Sara Kolsterr (US/NL) Tonewheels
- Nastro Mortal (IT)
- VON (ES/IT) - Choir
- Pita/Jade (GB/AT)
- Anaisa Franco/Theo Firmo (BR/ES)
- Jade Boyd/Simona Barbera (AU/IT-NL) Overground
- Dafne Boggeri/Rhythm King And Her Friends (IT/DE) You can wake up now, the universe has ended
- Olyvetty (aka Riccardo Benassi, Claudio Rocchetti) (IT) Nights Erase Days Erase Nights
- Chelpa Ferro (BR)
- Russell Haswell/Florian Hecker (UK/DE) UPIC Diffusion #15, #16
- Ricardo Caballero (MX)
- emiter_francza (aka Marcin Dymiter, Ludomir Franczak) (PL)
- Luka Dekleva, Luka Princic, Miha Ciglar (SL) FeedForward Cinema
- Safy Sniper (DE-IL)
- Doravideo (JP)
- Julieta Aranda (MX)
- Mylicon/EN (IT)
- Demons, Prurient/ Carlos Giffoni (US/VE)
- REV99 (aka 99 Hooker/Jin Hi Kim) (US, KR)
- Silver Apples with Bec Stupak (US) Joshua Light Show
- Los Super Elegantes (aka Milena Muzquiz and Martiniano Lopez Crozet) (MX/AR)
- Paul Kalkbrenner (DE)
- Ben Klock (DE)
- ZAPRUDER filmmakersgroup (IT) DAIMON (Cinema da camera/Anaglyph projection)
- Edwin van der Heide, Edwin van der Heide (NL) Pneumatic Sound Field
- Mirco Santi, Andrea Belfi (IT) Stilllivingrooms

=== Netmage 2009 ===
Venue:
Palazzo Re Enzo

Artists:

- Pete Swanson/John Wiese/Liz Harris (US)
- Pierre Bastien (FR)
- ATAK NIGHT: Keiichiro Shibuya/Evala (JP)
- Growing (US)
- Keiji Haino (JP)
- Invernomuto (IT)
- Sunburned Hand of the Man (US)
- Emeralds (US)
- Németh/Lotte Schreiber (AT)
- Andrea Dojmi/Flushing Device (IT)
- Mudboy (US)
- Black Dice (US)
- The Skaters /Roland Lethem (US/BE)
- Pascal Battus/Kamel Maad (FR)
- Mattin/" " [sic] Goldie (ES/GB)
- Thomas Ankersmit/Valerio Tricoli (NL/IT)
- Virgilio Villoresi/Dominique Vaccaro/Angstarbeiter (IT)
- Camilla Candida Donzella(IT)
- Bock & Vincenzi (GB)

=== Netmage 2010 ===
Venue:
Palazzo Re Enzo

Artists:

- Rachida Ziani/Dewi de Vree (NL/FR) Elektrolab
- Francesco Cavaliere/Marcel Türkowsky (IT/DE)
- Harappian Night Recordings (UK)
- The Hunter Gracchus (UK)
- Lee Hangjun/Hong Chulki (KR)
- My Cat Is An Alien (IT)
- Ectoplasm Girls (SE)
- The Magic State (SE)
- Be Maledetto Now (IT)
- Richard Lainhart (US)
- Cluster (DE)
- Canedicoda (IT)
- Nassa (Nadow Assor/Surabhi Saraf) (US)
- André Gonçalves (PT)
- Es (FN)
- Margareth Kammerer/Andrea Belfi/Stefano Pilia/Daniela Cattivelli/Michaela Grill (IT/DE/AT)
- Carlos Casas (ES)
- Vincent Dupont (FR)
- Nana April Jun (SE)
- Aaron Dilloway (US)

=== Netmage 2011 ===
Venue:
Palazzo Re Enzo

Artists:

- Massimiliano Nazzi (IT) Life Kills
- Barokthegreat/Michiel Klein (IT/NL) Russian Mountains
- Zapruder (IT) Criptofonia
- Gaëtan Bulourde/Olivier Toulemonde (FR/DE) Not every object used to nail is a hammer
- Calhau! (PT) Quadrologia Pentacònica
- James Ferraro (US) Toilet Toad T.V. Overdrive
- Bruce McClure (US) Se Volessi Fare Un Fuoco Che Seza Dano Infuocherebbe Una Sala, Farai Cosi
- Cao Guimarães/O Grivo (BR)
- Ries Straver/Adam Lieber (NL/SA) Mute Dog Loffa
- Thomas Köner/Jürgen Reble (DE) Camera Obscura
- Home Movies /In Zaire (IT) Paper Mache
- Luke Fowler/Keith Rowe/Peter Todd (UK) The Room
- Prince Rama (US) I Want My Life Back
- Pippi Langstrumpf (IT)

== See also ==
- List of electronic music festivals
- Video Art
- Performance Art
- Sound Art
- Expanded Cinema
- New Media
- Internet Art
- Noise Music
- Subculture
- Creative Class
