= Carlos Casas =

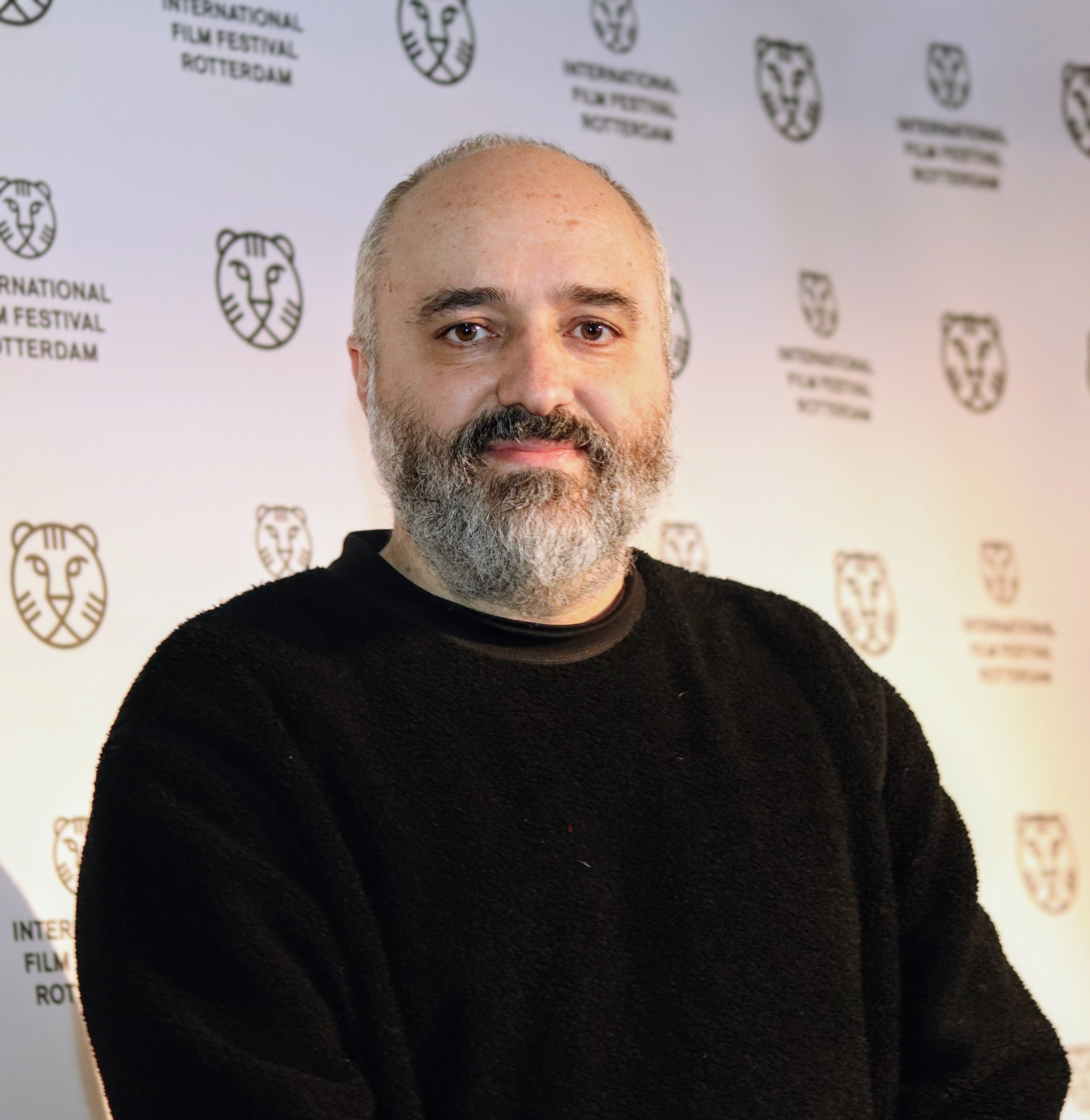
Carlos Casas at the 2026 International Film Festival Rotterdam

Carlos Casas is a filmmaker and artist whose practice encompasses film, sound and the visual arts.

== Biography ==
Carlos Casas studied fine arts, cinema and design.

In 1998 he was awarded an Artist-in-residence in Fabrica, research and communication center of Benetton.

In 2000 his short Film “Afterwords”, produced by Marco Müller and Fabrica Cinema was selected for Venice Film Festival, International Film Festival Rotterdam and Reencontres du Cinema in Paris 2001.

In 2001 he started a series of documentaries for Colors Magazine, and a series of Fieldworks, an ongoing experiment with ambiental video and radio frequencies, a sort of landscape video notes.

In 2003 he developed a 52 min documentary,”Rocinha. Daylight of a favela” shot on location in one of the biggest favelas in Rio de Janeiro. He also published a compilation of Funk Carioca in collaboration with DJ Marlboro and Irma Records.

In 2004 he finished “Aral. Fishing in an invisible sea” about the life of the three remaining generation of Fishermen in the Aral sea, which won the best documentary award in Torino Film festival 2004, and was selected for the International Film Festival Rotterdam 2005. Visions du Réel documentary film festival, Nyon, Switzerland 2005, One World Prague 2005, and Documenta Madrid 2005 where it received the special mention from the jury.

In May 2005 he finished a 52 min version of the Patagonia research “Solitude at the end of the world”which received the special prize from the Jury in BAFICI Buenos Aires International Festival of Independent Cinema 2006. The Siberia project ”Hunters since the beginning of time” is the last chapter of a trilogy of films dedicated to the most extreme environments in the world. (Patagonia, Aral, Siberia) was awarded Best Documentary Award in FICCO Mexico International Film Festival 2008. In 2008 he published a selection of forbidden funk [Proibidão]Proibidao CV: Forbidden Gang Funk From Rio de Janeiro for the label Sublime Frequencies.

In 2007 he presented in different festivals in his latest work Tundra from the Siberian Fieldworks series, a live media project premiered at Netmage Festival in Bologna and Sonar. and was also presented in Multiplicidade in Rio de Janeiro.

In 2008 he founded together with fellow artist friend, Nico Vascellari Von Archives an audiovisual label publishing experimental audiovisual productions. Later in 2009 he created with partner and wife Saodat Ismailova, Map Productions, a production house dedicated to develop audiovisual projects around the world, from feature films, to documentaries.

In 2010 he presented his Cemetery Archive Works in Netmage and his End trilogy was presented for the first time in Cineteca Mexicana. In June 2010 Hangar Bicocca in Milano presented END a comprehensive exhibition of the trilogy.

Avalanche (overture), his latest project, is an ongoing collaboration with the American sound artist and minimalist Phill Niblock based in the Pamir mountains, in one of the world's highest inhabited villages. Avalanche (overture) superimposes Casas' footage over the overtones of "Stosspeng," a piece by Niblock. It is designed as a visual-sonic journey, an intense audiovisual meditation and a sensory experience in which extremes meet: nature in its rawest state and the pure, breathtaking and heady sound of drones. Presented for the first time in its first incarnation in Sonar Festival, Avalanche aims to be an open film, reedited every time it is shown and adapted to the space it is presented. Avalanche is an organic example of film-making, an ongoing document to the disappearance of this village and a reactive film within its community Avalanche is alive together with the village, dying and born again every time it is presented. It has been presented in different museums, festivals and gallery spaces around Europe and the USA.

Cemetery, his latest project, is a take on the myth of the elephant cemetery. It was awarded in FID Marseille, and presented in festivals across the world.

He is co-founder of Map Productions and the visual sound label Von Archives.

He is currently researching and working on a new project based on the eruption of the Krakatoa volcano in Indonesia.

== Filmography ==
- Krakatoa (2026)
- Cemetery (2019)
- Avalanche (2010)
- Hunters Since the Beginning of Time (2008)
- Solitude at the End of the World (2005)
- Aral. Fishing in an Invisible Sea (2004)
- Rocinha. Daylight of a Favela (2003)
- Afterwords (2000)

== Awards ==
- Marseille Esperance Prize FIDMarseille 2019 (FID Marseille Festival International du Film) for Cemetery
- Meta Cultural Foundation Award FIDMarseille 2019 (FID Marseille Festival International du Film) for Cemetery
- High School Award FIDMarseille 2019 (FID Marseille Festival International du Film) for Cemetery
- Best Documentary Award FICCO 2007 (Mexico International Film Festival) for Hunters since the beginning of time
- Special Prize of the Jury BAFICI 2006 (Buenos Aires International Festival of Independent Cinema) for Solitude at the end of the world
- Best Documentary Award Torino Film Festival 2004 for Aral. Fishing in an invisible sea
- Special Prize of the Jury Documenta Madrid 2005 for Aral. Fishing in an Invisible Sea

== Discography ==
- Mutia (Matiere Memoire)
- Pyramid of Skulls (Discrepant)
- Vucca de lu puzzu (Canti Magnetici)
- Patagonian Field Recordings (Musica Moderna)
- Aral Field Recordings (Musica Moderna)
- Siberian Field Recordings (Von Archives)

== Galleries ==
- angels barcelona
- e/static, Turin
- Galerie Davide Gallo in Berlin
