= Gob Squad =

Gob Squad is a British-German collective based in Nottingham and Berlin. They have worked collaboratively since 1994 in the fields of performance, video installation and theatre.

== History ==
Gob Squad was founded in 1994. At the time, its members were students at Nottingham Trent University and the Institute for Applied Theatre Studies at the University of Giessen. They have made more than 50 projects to date. They create mid-scale work that combines audience interaction with real-time video editing. The company often use popular culture to explore the complexities of everyday life. Gob Squad create and present work in urban spaces, theatres and galleries

Core members of Gob Squad are Johanna Freiburg, Sean Patten, Sharon Smith, Berit Stumpf, Sarah Thom, Bastian Trost, and Simon Will; Eva Hartmann manages the group.

== Awards ==
- 2012: Drama Desk Award for Unique Theatrical Experience for Gob Squad's Kitchen (You've Never Had It So Good) in New York City, USA.
- 2020: Tabori Preis in Berlin, Germany
- 2024: Silver Lion Award at the Biennale Teatro in Venice, Italy.
