= F.I.S.Co. =

F.I.S.Co. (Festival Internazionale sullo Spettacolo Contemporaneo) was an international festival that showcases examples of the convergence taking place across the contemporary arts (dance, theatre, performance, visual and plastic arts). F.I.S.Co. was conceived and created by Xing a cultural network based in Bologna.

In 2012 the experience of F.I.S.Co. (11 editions from 2000 to 2011) merged into a new project by xing: Live Arts Week

== Editions ==
11 editions of the festival took place under the title:

- CORPO SOTTILE (2001)
- NON IO (arte in mancanza di soggetto) (2002)
- DOING (2003)
- YOUR PRIVATE SKY (2004)
- DEFICIT! (2005)
- FIGURA N° (2006)
- TODAY IS OK (2007)
- UNIVERSAL COSMIC MURMUR (2008)
- TRIBU' (2009)
- ( color cane che scappa )))) (2010)
- segue (2011)

== Locations ==
- In Bologna: GAM Galleria d'Arte Moderna di Bologna, Ex Bologna Motori, Ex Conservatoria Registri Immobiliari, Raum, Ebo-Urban Center Esposizioni Bologna, Galleria Accursio, Cineteca di Bologna, Fabrica Features, Cinema Lumière, neon>campobase, Link Project, Cassero/Salara, Sottopasso Ugo Bassi/Marconi, da Gino - L'arte del Barbiere, Cappella Santa Maria dei carcerati, PalaDozza, Sì, Teatro San Leonardo, Osteria del Sole, Teatro delle Celebrazioni, MAMbo, DOM la cupola del pilastro, Sferisterio, Teatro dell'Accademia di Belle Arti, Spazio Carbonesi, Teatro Duse
- InModena: Teatro Comunale.

== Artists ==
- Absalon (IL)
- Aernout Mik (Nl)
- Alessandro Bosetti (IT/DE)
- Alexander Petlura + Open (RU/IT)
- Alice Cattaneo(IT)
- Anna Huber (CH)
- Antonia Baehr (DE/FR)
- Antonija Livingstone / Heather Kravas (CA/US/FR)
- BAROKTHEGREAT vs guests (IT/NL/SE/UK)
- Barbara Manzetti (IT/FR)
- Bobby Baker (UK)
- Bojana Mladenovic (RS/NL)
- Brainstorming - Camera di Decompressione per Spettatori(IT)
- Brynjar Bandlien (NL)
- Camilla Candida Donzella (IT)
- Claudia Triozzi (FR/IT)
- Compagnia Virgilio Sieni Danza (IT)
- Compagnie 7273 (CH/FR)
- Cristina Rizzo (IT)
- Cuoghi Corsello (IT)
- Cuqui Jerez (ES/DE)
- Darren O'Donnell/Mammalian Diving Reflex (CA)
- Édouard Levé (FR)
- Eija-Liisa Ahtila (FI)
- Elia Suleiman (PS)
- Elodie Pong (CH)
- Erwin Wurm (AT)
- Eszter Salamon (FR/DE/CH)
- Eva Meyer Keller (SE/DE)
- Fabio Acca (IT)
- Fanny & Alexander (IT)
- Fahim Amir (AF/AU)
- Federico Bacci (IT)
- Fischli & Weiss (CH)
- Flavio Favelli (IT)
- Forced Entertainment (UK)
- Hans Van Den Broeck/fr:Les Ballets C. De La B. (BE)
- Jan Fabre (fr)/Erna Omarsdottir (BE/IS)
- Jan Kopp/*Melk Prod (CH/DE/FR)
- Jennifer Lacey/Nadia Lauro (US/FR)
- Jérôme Bel (FR)
- Jimmie Durham (US)
- John Baldessari (US)
- Joe Kelleher (UK)
- Jonathan Burrows/Matteo Fargion (UK)
- Jordi Colomer (ES/FR)
- Juan Dominguez (ES/DE)
- Katrin Schoof (DE)
- Kinkaleri (IT)
- Krõõt Juurak (EE/AU)
- La Ribot (ES/CH)
- Lacey/Lauro/Parkins/Cornell (FR/US)
- Laminarie (IT)
- Latifaa Labissi (FR)
- Loïc Touzé/Latifa Laâbissi/Compagnie 391 (FR)
- Luca Vitone (IT)
- Luca Vitone/Cesare Viel (IT)
- MK (IT)
- Marcel Broodthaers (BE)
- Marcello Maloberti (IT)
- Marco Berrettini/*Melk Prod (FR/CH/T)
- Marco Mazzoni (IT)
- Margareth Kammerer (IT/DE)
- Marie Gilissen (BE)
- Martine Pisani (FR)
- Marzia Migliora (IT)
- Maurizio Mercuri (IT)
- Mette Edvardsen (NL/BE)
- Mette Ingvartsen (DE/DK)
- Michael Fliri (IT)
- Moira Ricci (IT)
- Myriam Gourfink (FR)
- Mårten Spångberg (SE/DE)
- Nature Theater of Oklahoma (US)
- Nico Vascellari (IT)
- Olaf Breuning (CH)
- Residenza di Pensiero (IT/UK)
- Robin Rhode (ZA)
- Rodrigo Garcia (ES)
- Roman Signer (CH)
- Riccardo Benassi (IT/DE)
- Romeo Castellucci (IT)
- Sinistri/Simionato & Donnachie (IT/AU)
- Stoa - Scuola di movimento fisico e filosofico della Societas Raffaello Sanzio (IT)
- Susanna Scarpa (IT)
- Tim Etchells/Forced Entertainment (UK)
- Thomas Lehmen (DE)
- Vincent Dupont/Edna (FR)
- Xavier Le Roy/Eszter Salamon (FR/DE/CZ)
- Yves-Noël Genod (FR)
- Zachary Oberzan (US)
- ZimmerFrei (IT)

== See also ==
- Performing arts
- Performance Art

== External sources ==
- Silvia Fanti (Xing). "Cronache", in Zanetti, Uliana (eds) (2023). La performance a Bologna negli anni '70. Bologna. MAMbo – Museo d’Arte Moderna di Bologna. ISBN 978-88-96296-41-7
- Il Patalogo - annuario del teatro. milano. 2002.
- Il Patalogo - annuario del teatro. milano. 2003.
- Il Patalogo - annuario del teatro. milano. 2004.
- Il Patalogo - annuario del teatro. milano. 2005.
- Il Patalogo - annuario del teatro. milano. 2006.
- Il Patalogo - annuario del teatro. milano. 2007.
- Il Patalogo - annuario del teatro. milano. 2008.
- Il Patalogo - annuario del teatro. milano. 2009.
- "Ossigeno Italiano". Abitare. December 2008.
- "F.I.S.Co". ESTERICULT: Commissione Nazionale per la Promozione della Cultura Italiana all'Estero.
- "Radio Emilia Romagna". Regione Emilia Romagna.
- "corriere di bologna". Corriere di Bologna.
- "Ritorna F.I.S.Co., il festival dello spettacolo contemporaneo". Repubblica. April 2010.
- "F.I.S.Co". Vogue. April 2010.
- "F.I.S.Co.10: color cane che scappa". Rolling Stone. April 2010.
- XING Website
- Terrazze. Artisti, storie, luoghi in Italia negli anni zero luca, Barreca; Andrea, Lissoni; Luca, Lo Pinto; Costanza, Paisan (2014). Terrazze. Marsilio. pp. 66, 68, 69, 469, 479. ISBN 978-88-317-1511-9.
