= Xing (cultural organization) =

- Website: http://www.xing.it

Xing is a cultural organization based in Bologna, Italy, dedicated to the production and support of experimental practices within the arts. Xing was founded in 2000 by Daniele Gasparinetti, Silvia Fanti, Andrea Lissoni, Giovanna Amadasi and Federica Rossi. Their research focuses in particular on the field of live arts, performing arts and electronic arts.

== Activities ==
From 2000 to 2011, Xing organized in Bologna the festivals Netmage - International Live Media Festival, dedicated to electronic art and live media, and F.I.S.Co Festival Internazionale sullo Spettacolo Contemporaneo, dedicated to performing arts. Since 2012, the two festivals merged in the project Live Arts Week, an annual event dedicated to live arts, taking place in different locations in the city for ten editions (2012–2021). In 2021 Xing launched a vinyl-only record label of works by both Italian and international personalities linked to live performativity, entitled Xong. Since 2003, Xing has been curating a continuous programme in its space in Bologna, Raum and in Milan, Lima (active 2003–2006).

== Publications ==
- Fanti, Silvia (Xing), ed. (2003). Corpo sottile. Uno sguardo sulla nuova coreografia europea (Jérôme Bel, Xavier Le Roy, Myriam Gourfink, Kinkaleri, MK). Milano: Ubulibri. ISBN 978-8877482334
- Xing (2002). Italian Landscapes. Roma: Luca Sossella Editore. ISBN 88-87995-27-3
- Link Project/Xing (2000). Netmage - Piccola Enciclopedia dell’immaginario tecnologico. Milano: Mondadori. ISBN 8804485027

Contributions:

- Silvia Fanti (Xing). "Cronache", in Zanetti, Uliana (eds) (2023). La performance a Bologna negli anni '70. Bologna. MAMbo – Museo d’Arte Moderna di Bologna. ISBN 978-88-96296-41-7
- Caleo Ilenia, Di Matteo Piersandra, Sacchi Annalisa (2021). In fiamme. La performance nello spazio delle lotte (1967-1979). Venezia: bruno. ISBN 978-88-99058-19-7
- Silvia Fanti, Daniele Gasparinetti (Xing). "Piattaforme fluttuanti," in Sarah Cosulich, Stefano Collicelli Cagol (eds.). Quadriennale d'arte 2020 FUORI. Roma: Treccani. ISBN 978-88-12-00886-5
- Benassi, Riccardo (2020). Morestalgia. Roma: Nero editions. ISBN 978-88-8056-091-3
- Canedicoda (2018). Adagio con buccia. Roma: Nero editions. ISBN 978-88-8056-039-5
- Vascellari, Nico (2018). Codalunga (2015-2018). Roma: Nero editions. ISBN 978-88-8056-018-0
- Invernomuto (2012). Simone. Milano: Mousse publishing. ISBN 9788896501825
- Malzacher Florian, Tupajić Tea, Zanki Petra (eds.). Curating Performing Arts. #1 FRAKCJIA "Performing Arts Journal". No. 55, 2010.
