= Saodat Ismailova =

Uzbek film director

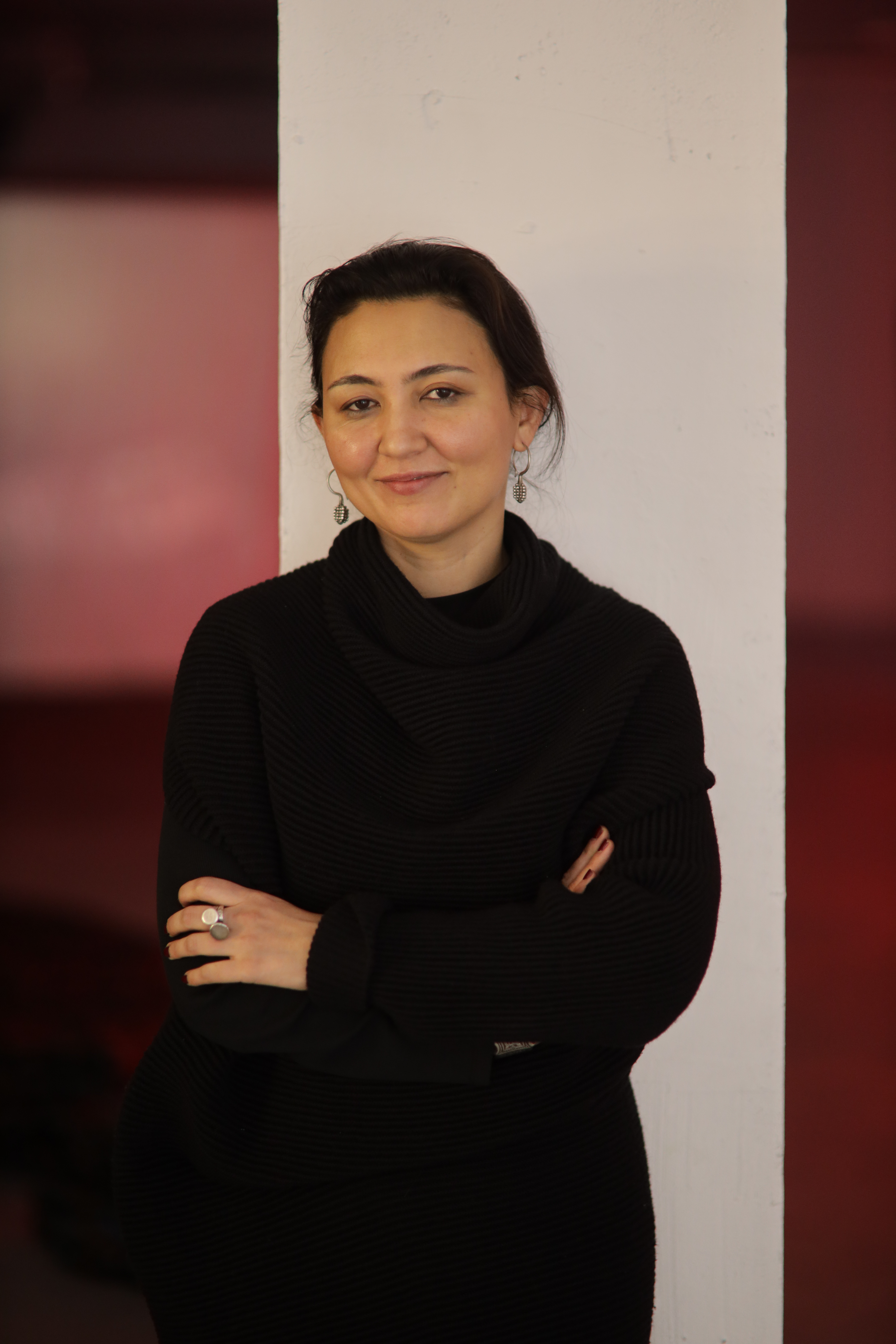
- Saodat Ismailova in 2021
- Born: 1981 (age 44–45); Tashkent, Uzbek SSR, Soviet Union
- Education: Uzbekistan State Institute of Arts and Culture, Le Fresnoy - Studio national des arts contemporains
- Occupation: Film director
- Website: https://saodatismailova.org

Saodat Ismailova (b. 1981) is an Uzbek filmmaker and artist who came of age in the post-Soviet era and has established an artistic life between Paris and Tashkent while remaining deeply engaged with her native region as a source of creative inspiration. After graduating in film making from the Tashkent State Institute of Arts, she began a residency at Fabrica, a research and communication center in Italy. Since then she shares her time between Tashkent, Uzbekistan and Paris, France. She first achieved international recognition with the release of Zukhra, a video installation that recounts the history of Uzbekistan through a state of sleeping character. In 2014, she premiered her first feature film, 40 Days of Silence, at the Berlin International Film Festival, where it was nominated for best debut film. She then went on to make a number of short films while at the Norwegian Office for Contemporary Art and Le Fresnoy, a French contemporary arts studio.

Ismailova has worked to develop and promote Central Asian cinema, both in Uzbekistan and Europe. In 2019, she put together an educational program CCA LAB with the support of ACDF on contemporary art in the Uzbek capital of Tashkent, where she also exhibited solo exhibition Q’org’on Chirog; and in 2021, she established the DAVRA collective, in order to research and publicise Central Asian culture.

In 2024 she participated at Nebula exhibition during 60th Venice Biennale of Arts where she presented Melted into the Sun commissioned by Fondazione In Between Art and Film. She has received Foundation Pernod Ricard’s Nouveau Programme support and became a golden medallist of Art Basel as an emerging artists in 2025.

== Biography ==
=== Early life and education ===
Saodat Ismailova was born in 1981, in Tashkent, the capital of the Uzbek Soviet Socialist Republic. She developed a passion for cinema at an early age, inspired by her father, an Uzbek cinematographer, and her grandmother, a storyteller. Ismailova studied film at the Uzbekistan State Institute of Arts and Culture, where she became a fan of the work of Soviet filmmakers Sergei Parajanov and Andrei Tarkovsky, who had broken from the established style of Soviet realism in favour of expressionist and existentialist themes. In 1999, she won the Grand Prize at the Student Tashkent Film Festival.

=== Work and exhibitions ===
After completing her studies at the State Art Institute of Tashkent, she was granted a residency at Fabrica, the Benetton Group's research and communications centre in Treviso, Italy. There she co-directed with Carlos Casas Aral: Fishing in an Invisible Sea, awarded Best Documentary at the 2004 Turin Film Festival.She also took charge of making documentary films about Central Asian music for Smithsonian Folkways. The following year, Ismailova was selected for the DAAD Artists-in-Residence programme in Berlin, where she started development on a feature film. In 2008, she formed the Central Asian production company MAP. In 2011, she attempted to shoot this feature in Uzbekistan, but had to film in Tajikistan for production reasons.

She gained worldwide recognition at the 2013 Venice Biennale for the video installation Zukhra, in which a woman recounts the history of Uzbekistan while lying in bed. The following year, she released her debut feature film, 40 Days of Silence, which she had developed at the Sundance Institute in Utah. The film premiered at the Berlin International Film Festival, where it was nominated for best debut film.

In 2017, she took up a residency at the Office of Contemporary Art, Norway (OCA), producing the short film The Haunted, which covered the extinction of the Turan tiger. The film was unveiled the same year at Tromsø Kunstforening. In 2018, Ismailova completed her studies at Le Fresnoy, France's National Studio of Contemporary Arts, where she realized Stains of Oxus and Two Horizons. That year also saw her multimedia performance Qyrq Qyz, which retold a Central Asian legend of 40 warrior women, and which was staged at BAM (Brooklyn Academy of Music) in New York and the Musée du quai Branly in Paris and produced by Aga Khan Music Program.

In 2019 she put together an educational program CCA Lab on contemporary art in Tashkent at the Centre for Contemporary Arts, Tashkent (CCAT) that lasted one year. The same year she exhibited a solo show "Syncretic verses" in Ilkhom theatre, and later the same year Q’org’on Chirog at CCAT; The following year, she produced the film Her Five Lives for the Asian Film Archive and "Her Five Lives" which charted the history of Women in Uzbekistan.

In 2021, Ismailova established the DAVRA collective, which brought together artists from throughout Central Asia, in order to preserve, document, and amplify Central Asian cultural heritage. The same year, Saodat Ismailova was invited to documenta fifteen, as the only Central Asian representative, she made a film which is Central Asian retelling of Cinderella. She created the 40-day program at documenta fifteen and hosted DAVRA participants, where they shared their research on Chilltans, a kind of spirit in Central Asian folklore as part of the Ismailova's participation in documenta fifteen. That same year, Ismailova had a solo exhibition at Aspan Gallery, Almaty, titled What was my name?.

Ismailova exhibited at the main exhibition Milk of Dreams at the 59th Venice Biennale:Chillahona a three channel video with a reimagined Tashkent traditional Embroidery, film is dedicated to perestroika years in Uzbekistan.That same year, she was awarded £25,000 by the EYE Filmmuseum, where she had her personal show, titled 18,000 Worlds.The jury recognised her exceptional ability to move fluidly between film and visual art, describing her work as "refreshing, urgent and balanced." She is also a receiver of Magnum Foundation, Counter Histories Program support, 2022.

She received Foundation Pernod Ricard’s Nouveau Programme support as well as Han Nefkens Foundatio Prize in collaboration with the Museo Reina Sofía (Madrid), the Singapore Art Museum (Singapore), and the Walker Art Center (Minneapolis) in 2024. She participated at Nebula exhibition during 60th Venice Biennale of Arts where she presented Melted into the Sun commissioned by Fondazione In Between Art and Film. The same year, she had a solo show at Pirelli HangarBicocca “A Seed Under Our Tongue,” the first survey of Saodat Ismailova's work in Italy. She has received Foundation Pernod Ricard’s Nouveau Programme support and became a golden medallist of Art Basel as an emerging artists in 2025. By invitation of Kunsten festival des Arts, Ismailova has presented newly commissioned performative work Arslanbob: The healing forest, 2025.

Her films are in the collections of the Stedelijk Museum, in Amsterdam, and the Centre Pompidou, in Paris, Tate Modern, UK, FRAC Corsica, TBA 21, Museum of Modern Art, Almaty, Tselliny Centre for Contemporary Culture, Almaty, M KHA, Antwerp, Victoria & Alberts, UK, Pinault Collection, CNAP and others.

== Style ==
Ismailova's films focus on Central Asian history, paying particular attention to women's history and cultural practices. Her work has been described as "hypnotic", due to her slow pacing and rhythmic editing style. The Eye Filmmuseum described her work as allowing the viewer to hear images and see sound. Ismailova herself said that her work intends to invite the viewer to "actively participate in the experience".
