= Trond Reinholdtsen =

Norwegian composer (born 1972)

Trond Reinholdtsen (born 7 November 1972) is a Norwegian contemporary composer and vocalist.

Reinholdtsen graduated from the Norwegian Academy of Music where he subsequently completed his diploma degree in composition. Reinholdtsen’s first pieces were modernistic, complex works in the German style, of which the best known is perhaps Psalm (Narrative Studies) for sinfonietta recorded on the album Faces (2000). He has also distinguished himself as a singer in the ensemble Nordic Voices, and is active as a culture critic and commentator.

Since his debut, Reinholdtsen’s music has developed in a performative direction; conventional music passages are fused with performance-based forms of expression including essayistic interpretations, live-camera filming and elements including statistical facts, and face-making. A trademark feature of his performances is the concert-ending “composer’s speech to the audience”; a talk that could be performed live on screen, in recorded format or relayed through instruments such as midi-drums.

In 2005, Reinholdtsen received the Fartein Valen Scholarship and in 2011 he was bestowed with the Arne Nordheim Composer’s Prize. His works have been performed internationally at festivals such as the Huddersfield Contemporary Music Festival and Donaueschinger Musiktage.

== Production ==
=== Selected works ===
- Ø episode 7 (2016)
- Theory of the Subject (2016)
- Ø episode 6 (2015)
- Ø episode 5 (2015)
- Ø episode 4 (2015)
- Ø episode 3 (2015)
- Ø episode 2 (2015)
- Ø episode 1 (2015)
- Narcissus opra (2013)
- Inferno (40') (2013)
- 12-Spartenhaus (2012)
- Musik (2012)
- Faust, or the Decline of Western Music (2011)
- Utopia (2011)
- John Gabriel Borkman (2011)
- The Apocalypse (2010)
- Orpheus (2010)
- Unsichtbare Musik (2009)
- The Norwegian Opra launch and gala happening (2009)
- The Wild Duck (2008/2009)
- Collected Music Performance Videos (2008)
- Concert Music Piece (2008)
- 13 Music Theatre Pieces (2008)
- Ny Musikk-revyen (2008)
- Worlds beyond (2008)
- Ghosts (2007)
- Des Moines / Sparta + Music (2006)
- Everyday (2005)
- Catalogue of Emotions (2005)
- Reinholdtsens Ode to Solitude (2005)
- Antigone Absence (2005)
- In context. (2004)
- Turba - Theories of Mass Society (2003)
- Goddag madam Reinholdtsen, God aften frøken Flink (2003)
- Hörreste (2002)
- Wie man zum Stein spricht (2000)
- Hun-hadde-pupp-i-nesa-si (2000)
- Processes of the Interstitual (1999)
- Bagatellen (1999)
- Aus der Vergängnis (1999)
- Psalm (1998)
- Strukturelle Konstellation II (1997)
- ... and yet there will be a hundred visions and indecisions (1997)

=== Discography ===
- Concepts of Sorrow (2006)
- Faces (2000)
