= Duppy Gun =

Amero-Jamaican dancehall music label

Duppy Gun is a dancehall record label run by Cameron Stallones of Sun Araw and M. Geddes Gengras, based in Los Angeles, California. The label began in Portmore, Jamaica in 2011 after a collaboration between Stallones, Gengras and Jamaican vocal group The Congos on the album Icon Give Thank for RVNG Intl. Duppy Gun releases feature collaborations from American experimental electronic artists and Jamaican singers. Past albums have included production from Peaking Lights, Sun Araw, M. Geddes Gengras, Matthewdavid and vocals by I Jahbar, Lukani, Fyah Flames, G sudden, and Dayone. Since their second release, the 12" vinyl Spy / Up Wit You, the label has been distributed by Los Angeles' Stones Throw Records. The 2014 double LP Duppy Gun Productions Vol 1 featured all of their previous released tracks as well as new music and featured vocalists "from more established roots singers to fisherman to very young neighborhood kids."

== Discography ==
Updated 7 March 2016

- Dayone / Early One Multiply / Earth (12") DPY001 2011
- Duppy Gun, I Jahbar, Lukani Spy/Up Wit You (12") DPPY002 2013
- Fyah Flames, I Jahbar What Would You Say (12") DPPY003 2013
- Bookfa / G Sudden Press Bookfa Press / Girls Dem Need Mi (12") DPPY004 2013
- Various Multiply: Duppy Gun Productions, Vol. 1 (2xLP, Comp, Gat) DPY005 2014
- Various Multiply: Duppy Gun Productions, Vol. 1 (CD, Comp, Promo) DPY005 2014
- Genesis Hull Who Feels It, Knows It (12xFile, MP3, Mixed, 320) 2014
