= Folkest =

Folkest is a festival devoted to music of all ethnicities and cultures of the world, held in the municipalities of Friuli-Venezia Giulia and in some of Veneto, Carinthia, Slovenia and Istria, in July of each year.

The purpose of the organizers is to promote folk music worldwide, through the publication of the magazine traditions, dance and music Folk Bulletin, books and CDs.

== History ==
The festival began in 1979, but only since 1984 it is called Folkest.

The headquarters of the organising committee is Spilimbergo (PN) which, together with Udine, is the location of concerts.
