= Xavier Le Roy =

French dancer/choreographer (1961–present)

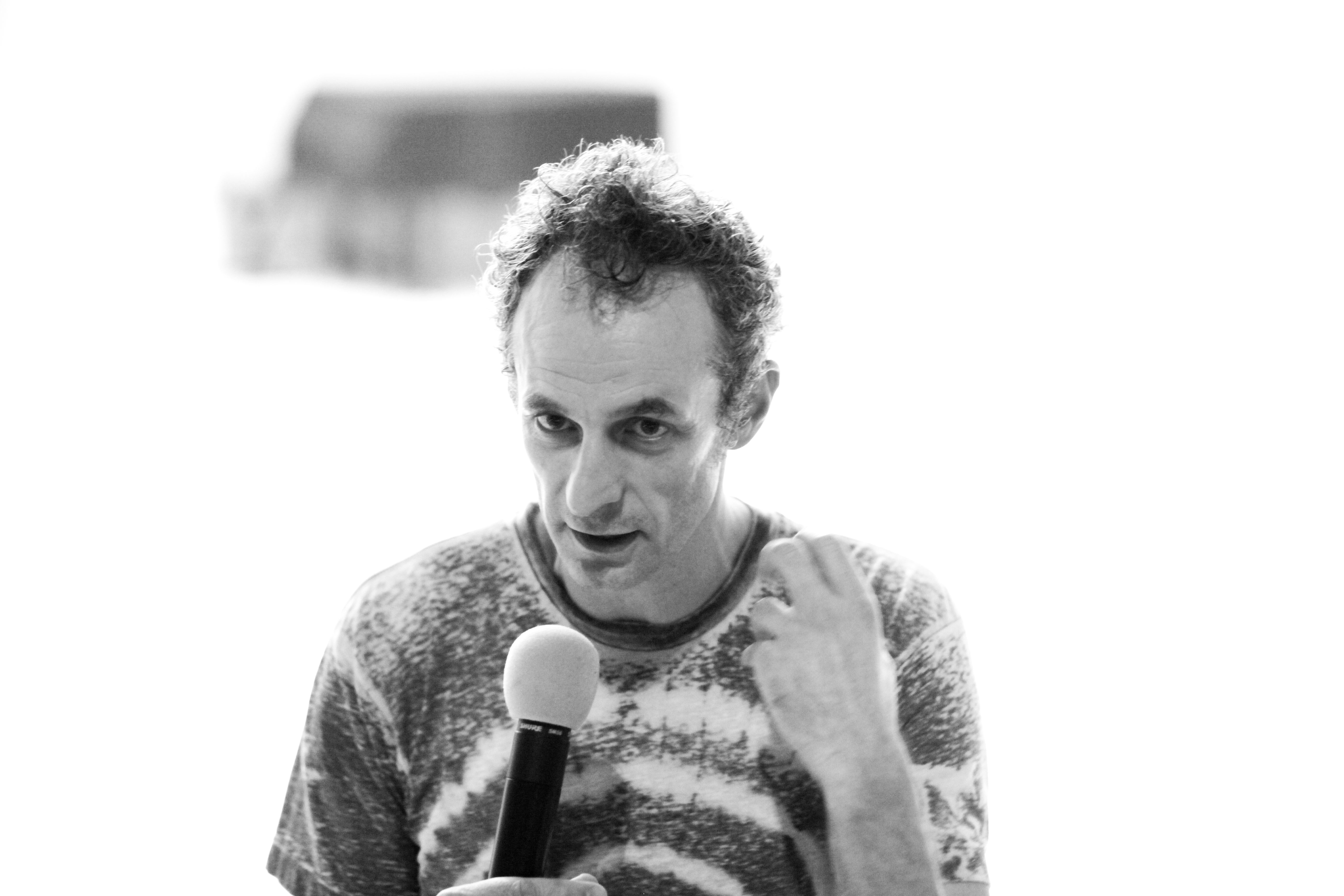
- Born: 1963 (age 62–63); Juvisy-sur-Orge, France
- Occupation: Dancer/choreographer
- Years active: 1991-present
- Organization: Institute for Applied Theatre Studies

Xavier Le Roy is a French-German artist known for his work in contemporary dance and choreography. He was born 1963 in Juvisy-sur-Orge, France.

== Education ==
Xavier Le Roy holds a doctorate in molecular biology from the University of Montpellier in France.

== Career ==
He transitioned from science to dance. This way, he started his career as an artist in 1991. Since 2018, he has worked as a professor at the Institute for Applied Theater Studies in Giessen, Germany. Since 1 October 2023, Prof. Le Roy has held the position of managing director of the Institute for Applied Theatre Studies.

== Works ==
His works include the solo "Le Sacre du Printemps" (2007), "Untitled" (2014), the group piece "low pieces" (2011), and exhibition works such as "Production" (2011) with Mårten Spångberg, "Untitled" (2012) for the exhibition 12 Rooms, "Retrospective" (2012) at Tapiès Foundation-Barcelona, "Temporary Title, 2015" in Sydney for John Kaldor Public Art Project, and "For The Unfaithful Replica" (2016) with Scarlet Yu at CA2M Madrid. In 2017, he collaborated with Ensemble Issho Ni for the exhibition "Haben Sie 'Modern' gesagt?" for Ensemble Modern in Frankfurt and, with Scarlet Yu, developed "Still Untitled," a public space work commissioned by Skulptur Projekte Münster 2017.
