= Mandrea Music Festival =

Mandrea Music Festival (previously 'Mandstock Festival') is an annual music festival taking place in Trentino by Lake Garda in Italy since 2012.

In 2015, the festival was reviewed as one of Europe's best summer music festivals by The Telegraph's travel blog, and as one of the 10 "best festivals in Europe... that you've probably never heard of" by The Guardian's travel blog.

The music often features roots reggae headliners on the Amphitheater stage, UK folk music at the Banjo Buddha stage, as well as rock, dub, hip-hop and electronica on other stages around the site. Previous performances have included Will White of the Propellerheads, Israel Vibration, The Banyans and The Gladiators.

The festival also organizes many sporting activities such as skate boarding, mountain biking, rock climbing, canyoning, and runs a regular shuttle bus to various locations in the area.
