= 10 Pianos Street =

#10 Pianos Street is a concert-installation for ten old pianos composed by Yae for the Piano City Milano festival. It has been staged and performed for the first time in May 2013 at the prestigious Modern Art Gallery of Milan (GAM). #10 Pianos Street has been performed again in 2014 and in 2015 in Milan for the Expo in Città opening ceremony, for the Pietà Rondanini Museum opening ceremony, for the Nuova Darsena opening ceremony, in 2016 and 2017 for the Milan Design Week (Fuorisalone), in Varese for Cult City Lombardia, and in Milan for the Teatro del Buratto Bruno Munari opening Ceremony.

Ten old pianos, reconditioned, elaborated by street-artists and positioned in a strategic location in the town, play an original suite composed with spatial effects and choreographies involving the pianists. One of the pianos is free: everybody can sit down and play, improvising on the sounds of the suite. The score is fitted for an ensemble of piano students and teachers and includes parts with difficulties from amateur to expert. If possible, a famous pianist gets involved as tutor of the pianos ensemble. Out of the performances, everybody can enjoy the pianos.

Every piano is on sale both as musical instrument and as a work of art, and the amount is donated to a charity project.

#10 Pianos Street is a farm to fork concept (local musicians, instruments, production and charity project); it aims to exchange energies from the outskirts (the street-artists, the schools of music, the old pianos) to the downtown and vice versa (the production costs, the charity project).

From October 2017 #10 Piano Street is hosted by the Teatro del Buratto Bruno Munari in Milan.
