= Sorour Darabi =

Iranian-born French choreographer

Sorour Darabi (Persian: سرور دارابی; born in 1990, Shiraz) is an Iranian dancer and choreographer. S.he is a member of the ICCD, an underground association that organised the Untimely festival in Tehran. Since 2013, s.he is based in Paris because s.he is a representative of a form of dance that is taboo in Iran.

In 2013, Darabi started studying dance in France. S.he entered the Exerce master program at CCN (Centre Chorégraphique National) in Montpellier. Subject to change, a performance about transformations that occur in relation to time and various places, is the result of Darabi's master program.

== S.he ==
Darabi uses the pronoun "s.he" instead of the traditional binary-based pronouns he or she, explaining:

“I don't define myself as a trans artist but a non-binary one.…, I insist on this inclusive process which is close to what I am experiencing. Assigned woman at my birth, I am in transition and in permanent transformation. I'm looking for fluidity in the gender."

In 2016, Darabi was interviewed in the context of the performance of Farci.e on the festival Montpellier Danse. In the interview, s.he explained the differences of public debate on gender in France and Iran. Darabi's sexual identity is subversive and political in the Iranian context. Accordingly, in Iran sex reassignment surgery is allowed by the authorities only to hinder the formation of homosexual relations. Therefore, it is only a way of preserving the heterosexual norms. The Iranian government prefers transgender individuals who go through the operation rather than having citizens with complex gender identity or homosexuals.

== Career ==
In 2016, Darabi created a solo performance called Farci.e which is about language as a gendered discourse. It explores the notions of "language, gender identity and sexuality."

Among Darabi's other projects Savušun (2019) is a prominent one that examines grief and its effect in Iranian culture. Darabi has participated in several international festivals including Kunstenfestivaldesarts in Belgium and Onassis in Greece.
