= Nico Vascellari =

Italian artist

Nico Vascellari (born 1976 in Vittorio Veneto, Italy) is an Italian artist. His work is a mix between performance art and sound exploration. He is represented by Monitor Gallery in Italy.

== Exhibitions ==
Vascellari has exhibited internationally and his work was featured in the 52nd Venice Biennale and a number of other biennale throughout Europe.

In 2012 he and Nicolo Fortuni founded Niños du Brasil, an electronic/batucada/noise band, and music remains a central park of his art practice.

Vascellari's work is part of Soho House Rome and he has collaborated with Fendi on several occasions.
