= Darktown (disambiguation) =

Darktown is a former African-American neighbourhood of Atlanta, Georgia U.S.

Darktown or Dark Town may also refer to:

- Darktown (album), a 1999 album by Steve Hackett
- Darktown Comics, a series of racist-caricature prints produced by Currier and Ives
- Darktown Revue, a 1931 film
- Darktown Strutters, a 1975 blaxploitation musical comedy film
- "Darktown Strutters Ball", a 1917 song composed by Shelton Brooks, and recorded by Ella Fitzgerald and others
- Dark Town, a comic book by Canadian cartoonist Kaja Blackley
- Darktown, a 2016 novel by Thomas Mullen
