= Arthur C. Krause =

American football player and coach

Arthur Krause
Playing career

Football
- 1912–1914: Indiana
- 1916: Pine Village Athletic Club
- Position: End

Coaching career (HC unless noted)

Football
- 1921: Gunnison HS (CO)
- 1922–1924: Western State (CO)

Basketball
- 1923–1927: Western State (CO)

Head coaching record
- Overall: 5–10–1 (college football); 14–26 (college basketball)

Arthur C. Krause was an American football player and coach. He served as the head football coach at Western State College of Colorado—now known as Western Colorado University—in Gunnison, Colorado from 1922 to 1924, compiling a record of 5–10–1.

Krause played collegiately at Indiana University and spent one season with the professional Pine Village Athletic Club.
