= Shermantown =

Shermantown may refer to:

- Shermantown (Atlanta), a late 19th-century African-American shantytown east of downtown Atlanta, Georgia
- Shermantown, a historically African-American neighborhood of Stone Mountain, Georgia
- Shermantown, Nevada, a US ghost town
