= Darktown =

Neighborhood in Atlanta, Georgia

Coordinates: 33.760592°N 84.381572°W

Darktown was an African-American neighborhood in Atlanta, Georgia. It stretched from Peachtree Street and Collins Street (now Courtland Street), past Butler Ave. (now Jesse Hill Jr. Ave.) to Jackson Street. It referred to the blocks above Auburn Avenue in what is now Downtown Atlanta and the Sweet Auburn neighborhood. Darktown was characterized in the 1930s as a "hell-hole of squalor, degradation, sickness, crime and misery".

It is the setting for Thomas Mullen's 2016 novel Darktown.

The term "darktown" was also used generically in Atlanta and the rest of the South to refer to African-American districts. Currier and Ives produced a series of popular racist-caricature lithographs under the title Darktown Comics, ostensibly set in a Black town.

It is used as such in the title of the famous song "Darktown Strutters' Ball" and 1899 Charles Hale song At a Darktown Cakewalk.
