= The Last Town on Earth =

2006 novel by Thomas Mullen

- First edition
- Author: Thomas Mullen
- Language: English
- Genre: Novel
- Publisher: Random House (US); Fourth Estate (UK)
- Publication date: August 29, 2006
- Publication place: United States
- Media type: Print (Hardback & Paperback)
- Pages: 392
- ISBN: 978-1-4000-6520-2
- OCLC: 62679900
- Dewey Decimal: 813/.6 22
- LC Class: PS3613.U447 L37 2006

The Last Town on Earth is a 2006 novel by American writer Thomas Mullen. The novel explores events in the fictional town of Commonwealth, Washington in 1918 during World War I and the Spanish flu epidemic. The town agrees to quarantine itself from the outside world, hoping to escape the international epidemic of the flu. Phillip Worthy, the adopted son of Charles Worthy, the town founder, brings a lost soldier into the town. While he appears to be healthy, residents begin to suffer the flu, and start to turn against each other.

The politics of the Industrial Workers of the World, American Protective League, and the Four Minute Men, as well as the aftermath of the Everett Massacre, play major roles in the novel. According to the author's afterword, he created the fictional community of Commonwealth inspired by his studies of Gunnison, Colorado (which imposed a quarantine trying to prevent the flu) and the socialist communes in Washington state of Equality Colony, Freeland, and Home. Mullen also cited John M. Barry's 2004 book The Great Influenza as inspiration.

This novel won the James Fenimore Cooper Prize for Best Historical Fiction in 2007. The New York Times Book Review calls it a "remarkable first novel" and praises the novel's "brilliant series of plot twists" and "carefully detailed historical context". However there have been multiple criticisms of the novel being slow paced and sexist.
