= Darktown (novel) =

2016 novel by Thomas Mullen

- First edition hardback cover
- Author: Thomas Mullen
- Language: English
- Set in: Darktown Atlanta
- Publisher: Atria
- Publication date: 2016
- Publication place: United States
- Media type: Print, ebook, audiobook
- Pages: 373 pages
- ISBN: 1501133861 First edition hardcover
- Followed by: Lightning Men

Darktown, published in 2016, is the fourth novel by American author Thomas Mullen. Its first sequel, Lightning Men, was published in September 2017. In 2020 Midnight Atlanta, the second sequel, was published.

This novel, based in 1948 Atlanta, blends elements of historical fiction and crime fiction to tell the story of Lucius Boggs and Tommy Smith, fictional characters who serve as two of Atlanta's first eight African-American police officers. The pair is tasked with investigating the murder of a young African-American woman and the injustices surrounding her murder, despite the many obstacles and restrictions placed upon them.

== Author's background ==
Thomas Mullen lived in several cities before moving to Decatur, Georgia. Mullen likes how Decatur has a "real community of writers and readers." The city also "felt like a comfortable place for me to be". Mullen was inspired to write Darktown after reading Where Peachtree Meets Sweet Auburn: A Saga of Race and Family by Gary Pomerantz. He finished his first draft after Michael Brown was shot. parallels between past and present "issues of race and police violence" drove Mullen to continue Darktown so he can remind readers "that nothing that is happening today is completely without precedent".

== Historical Context ==
Atlanta experienced tremendous growth in the late 1800s and early 1900s. The city prospered from new businesses and new employees. However, the city became divided from "social, political, and racial tensions". Thus, city officials segregated Atlanta into two districts: "Great White Way" for white Atlantans and "Sweet Auburn" for African-American Atlantans. The division allowed Atlantans to live separately without racial mixing. Sweet Auburn allowed African-Americans to "acquire property and live comfortably in modest to wealthy homes".

Although Sweet Auburn was home to upper-class African-Americans, sections of Atlanta still had shanties for poor African-Americans. White people used derogatory slang names for these impoverished sections: Darktown and Shermantown. With the city's growing population, the Atlanta Police Department strove for "greater efficiency" by employing more policemen and establishing the Central Headquarters Building. The African-American communities advocated for their own officers. In 1948, Mayor William B. Hartfield negotiated with African-American leaders to hire eight African-American police officers in return for their votes. However, the eight police officers had "many restrictions": they only patrolled African-American neighborhoods, could not arrest white people, and while they were given guns, it was understood that they could not fire the guns. The African-American police officers also had different headquarters, a "basement of the local 'colored' YMCA". The mayor and police chief wanted to separate the African-American officers for their own protection from the white officers. Their headquarters, known as Butler Street YMCA, is known as the "Black City Hall of Atlanta".

== Plot ==
Darktown, set in 1940s Atlanta, follows the story of Lucius Boggs and Tommy Smith, two of Atlanta's first African-American police officers. The novel begins when Boggs and Smith are patrolling in a predominantly African-American neighborhood when they witness a white man hit and knock over a lamppost and slowly flee the scene. The pair, on foot, order the man to pull over and notice an African-American woman in a yellow dress with a bruise on her face in the passenger seat. The cops are unable to convict the white man, later identified as Brian Underhill, due to his race, so they call in white police officers for backup. Officer Lionel Dunlow and his partner, Dennis "Rake" Rakestraw, show up as backup and let the man off without penalty.

While patrolling, Boggs and Smith find the dead body of the woman they had previously seen in Brian Underhill's vehicle. They notice a bullet hole in her chest and no blood near the scene, implying that her body has been moved. The pair return to their headquarters, where they fill out a report on the findings. Boggs calls to get information from records, and he discovers that Brian Underhill was fired from the police force in 1945.

Boggs and Smith call Dunlow and Rake to the scene of an assault on the African-American side of town. Upon arrival, a man has been stabbed and instead of helping the situation, Dunlow beats the stabbed man and refuses to call an ambulance, which forces Boggs to run to a callbox and call for one himself. Dunlow leaves the scene, but Rake stays behind and reveals to Boggs that Underhill's name was removed from the report he submitted on the murder of the woman in the yellow dress.

Boggs later receives a call from Toon, a writer at The Daily Times, who tells him that the woman in the yellow dress is believed to be the daughter of Otis Ellsworth, a farmer from a fictional town, Peacedale. Ellsworth identifies the woman's body as his stepdaughter, Lily Ellsworth. Boggs questions the farmer and discovers that she worked as a maid for Senator Prescott. Boggs visits the Prescott's house and uncovers that Lily had left this job months ago.

Meanwhile, Rake stakes out Brian Underhill's apartment in Mechanicsville, until he sees his partner, Dunlow, enter into the apartment. Rake eavesdrops on the two and his suspicion increases.

After seeing Dunlow and Underhill enter a brothel called "Mama Dove's" in the African-American part of town, Rake decides to investigate. Mama Dove tells Rake that Underhill often picks up "her girls," and they are never seen again. Rake tails Underhill again and is caught. The pair fight and Rake tries to get Underhill to answer questions about Lily's murder. Unsuccessful, he leaves and hears shots behind him. He then finds Underhill dead. Rake leaves the scene as to not incriminate himself of the murder.

Rake visits Silas Prescott, Senator Prescott's son, to ask him some questions about Lily. Silas tells Rake that Lily was fired because she stole something from their family. Rake is tipped off on the phone to meet an unknown caller at a park for information on the murder. When Rake arrives, he is sabotaged by ex-cops that reveal Underhill was part of the "Rust Division," a group that cleans up after murders and crimes committed by high profile individuals. Dunlow hears from Mama Dove that Rake had come to her asking questions about Underhill and Dunlow. A very drunk Dunlow picks up Rake and takes him to his shed where he reveals that he had a child with Mama Dove, who was hit by a car and killed. When Rake goes to leave, Dunlow picks up his gun, whispers the word, "bang," and pretends to shoot Rake.

Smith and Boggs go to Peacedale to try and find answers about Lily's murder from her family; and the local officers run the pair out of town. They try to warn the Ellsworth family of the danger they are in, but it is too late. Smith and Boggs are told that the family's house is on fire. Officer Boggs later calls Rake and reveals to him that Lily's mother was previously an employee for the Prescott's and she was taken advantage of by young Senator Prescott in the 20s, resulting in her pregnancy with Lily.

Still unsure of who actually murdered Lily, Rake confronts Silas Prescott and Silas reveals that he had sexual relations with Lily, and when he found out she was his sister, he murdered her. Before Rake can arrest him, Silas shoots himself in the head in front of Rake and dies. Meanwhile, Dunlow attempts to murder Boggs by running him over. Boggs gets out of the way, but not before Dunlow knocks him unconscious with his car door. Dunlow takes Boggs's body and puts him in the trunk of his car to bury Boggs. When they arrive at their destination, Boggs overpowers Dunlow instead and kills him. He buries him with the help of Smith. The story ends with the light post on Auburn Avenue finally being repaired.

== Major characters ==
Lucius Boggs – One of the first, eight African-American police officers for the Atlanta Police Department. He is the partner of Officer Tommy Smith and the son of the esteemed Reverend Boggs. He was in the army in South Carolina, but was not allowed to fight due to race discrimination. Boggs is responsible for opening and solving the investigation of Lily Ellsworth's murder. He is also responsible for killing Lionel Dunlow in an act of self-defense.

Thomas "Tommy" Smith – One of the first, eight African-American police officers in Atlanta. Officer Smith is the hot-tempered partner of Lucius Boggs. He assists Lucius Boggs in solving the murder of Lily Ellsworth. He also helps him with the burial of Lionel Dunlow's body.

Brian Underhill – An ex-Atlanta Police Department officer. Underhill was fired from the department for being part of a gambling ring. Since being fired, he serves as a member of the "Rust Division." He is pulled over by Boggs and Smith for drunk driving and for hitting a lamp post. Underhill is the last person seen with Lily Ellsworth. His story ends when he is shot and killed outside of an abandoned factory after an altercation with Dennis Rakestraw. His killer is unknown.

Lionel Dunlow – A veteran officer of the Atlanta Police Department. Before his death, he was the partner of Dennis Rakestraw. Dunlow has been an officer for over twenty years. The moment he and Rakestraw respond to the call from Boggs and Smith, he is already familiar with Brian Underhill, though he conceals it. He worked alongside Underhill before Underhill was fired from the Atlanta Police Department. Dunlow is also very well-known by Mama Dove and the women that work at her brothel. He is responsible for locating James "Triple James" Jameson after he escaped from prison. After an unsuccessful attempt to kill and bury Lucius Boggs, he is ultimately killed by Boggs. His body is then buried by Boggs and Smith.

Dennis "Rake" Rakestraw – A rookie officer of the Atlanta Police Department, husband, and father. Rake is the partner of Dunlow. Rakestraw assists Officers Boggs and Smith in solving Lily Ellsworth's murder. Rakestraw discourages his brother-in-law, Dale, from committing any crimes against the only black neighbor that had recently moved to their community. Rake is responsible for convincing Silas Prescott to confess to the murder of Lily Ellsworth. After becoming privy to Dunlow's involvement with Brian Underhill and Mama Dove, he requests a new partner. His request is fulfilled.

Otis Ellsworth – While he is technically Lily Ellsworth's stepfather, Otis Ellsworth considers himself to be Lily's only father and raised her from birth. Mr. Ellsworth lives on and maintains a farm fifty miles south of Atlanta. He contacts Boggs after seeing Lily's description in The Daily Times. He meets Boggs in Atlanta to identify the body. Mr. Ellsworth is taken into custody and violently questioned by APD police. He received "hush" money from his daughter Lily shortly before her death. With this money, Otis buys a new truck. After he is harassed by Peacedale Police, he decides to move himself and his family to Chicago. Before his departure from Peacedale, Otis Ellsworth stops by a supply store with his son. He instructs his son to go home while he is detained. This is the last time Otis is seen alive by anyone is his family. He is shot and killed by the Peacedale Police. The Peacedale Police told Atlanta Police that before his death, Otis confessed to the murder of Lily.

Lily Ellsworth – Described in the beginning as simply "the girl in the yellow dress," Lily is later revealed to be the daughter of Senator Prescott. She moved to Atlanta from Peacedale for a better life and becomes a maid for the Prescott family. After being fired from her job at the Prescott house, she lives at Mama Dove's brothel. She is last seen in the car with Brian Underhill, and then found dead in a pile of garbage. She is killed by her half-brother, Silas Prescott, who also rapes her.

Senator Prescott – The biological father of Lily Ellsworth. When he was a young man, Lily's mother was a maid in their house, and he raped her resulting in the pregnancy of Lily. He is a congressman for the state of Georgia. Prescott's political platform is based on helping the African-American community, but it is revealed this is strictly for political gain.

Mama Dove – Brothel owner. She was once in love with Dunlow and had a son who died at four. She allows Lily to hide in her brothel per Underhill's request. Mama Dove works with the white police officers because they keep her business from being shut down.

Silas Prescott – Son of Senator Prescott and Lily Ellsworth's half-brother. He rapes Lily and later murders her. He is questioned twice by Rake about Lily and any information about her and her murder. Silas lies about the information about Lily, but Rake convinces him to tell the truth. Silas confesses to the murder and then kills himself in front of Rake.

== Publication ==
- (2016). Darktown (softcover, 1st print ed.) New York: 37Ink. 978-1-50113-835-5
- (2016). Darktown (hardcover, 1st print ed.) New York: 37Ink/Atria Books. 978-1-50113-386-2
- (2016). Darktown (hardcover, large print ed.) Michigan: Wheeler Publishing Large Print. 978-1-41049-377-4
- (2016). Darktown (ebook, reprint ed.) New York: Simon & Schuster. 978-1-50113-388-6
- (2016). Darktown (audiobook ed.) New York: Simon & Schuster Audio. 978-1-44239-949-5
- (2016). Darktown (audio ed.) New York: Simon & Schuster Audio. 978-1-4423-9948-8
- (2017). Darktown (softcover, reprint ed.) New York: 37 Ink. 978-1-50113-387-9

== Reception ==
Darktown quickly received high praise in literary reviews from respected sources such as The New York Times, The Atlanta Journal-Constitution, The Washington Post, HuffPost, and The Economist. The same year as publication, 2016, Jamie Foxx bought the rights to turn Darktown into a television series.

The Economist says, "[Darktown] is a fine, unflinching example of the increasingly widespread use of crime fiction to explore social issues." NPR calls the police violence and brutality in Darktown's 1948 setting "disturbingly familiar", bringing attention to the parallels of current policing infrastructure. Marilyn Stasio of The New York Times commended the book for its "ferocious passion" and "incendiary image [that] ignites the next in this highly combustible procedural [...] that'll knock the wind out of you." David Troutt of The Washington Post mentions the real life lynching of Bobby Hall, which occurred a few years prior to the book's start, stating that the book has "proven [Mullen] is skilled at bringing the past to life." The Washington Post further emphasizes that the detail in which Mullen shows racism and corruption in the police force—and against African-Americans in general—is not to be understood as "excessive [...] because we are still living it today". Troutt also proclaims that the book "walk[s] a fine line between art that reminds us of horrors past and art that trades on them with pieces too unfinished to play with," and he concludes that, "Mullen is a wonderful architect of intersecting plotlines and unexpected answers [...] an author who cares about history and how it is being lived by his characters." The Library Journal also reviewed the work, writing that "some readers may brace against the routine use of epithets, but fans of well-written literary thrillers will want this expert example".

A major theme found in Darktown is police corruption, but Mullen also brings up other historical topics like the evolution of the Dixiecrats and "the war between moonshiners and legitimate distributors". Kirkus Reviews is more critical of the themes in Darktown, stating that while the book had a great subject, it tells a "larger story of postwar America in which some veterans came back victorious only to find they were fighting another kind of fascism on the homefront." Kirkus Reviews suggests the book's "characters exist as signifiers of ideas rather than people" and that "a great historical subject deserves better than this by-the-numbers rendition".

=== Awards ===
- Los Angeles Times Book Prize (nominated)
- Audie Awards 2017 Finalist for Fiction (nominated)
