= Gunnison, Colorado =

City in Colorado, United States

- Home rule municipality
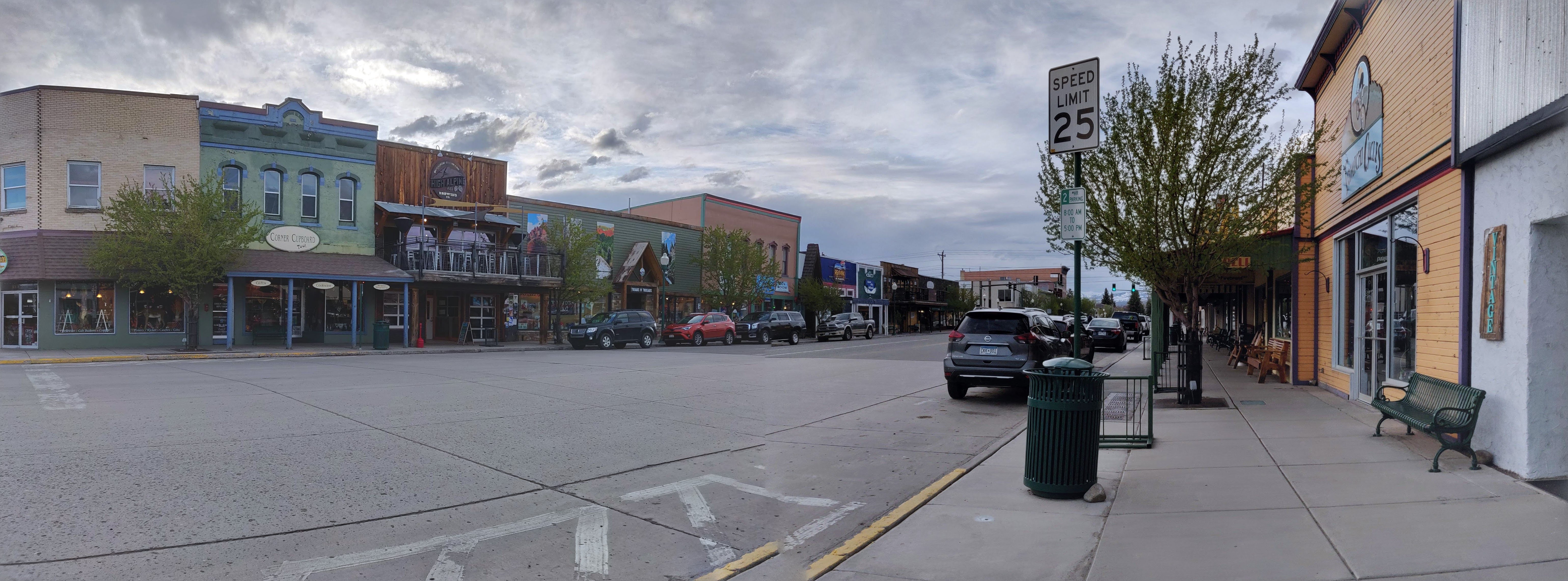
- Storefronts along Main Street in Gunnison.
- Motto: "Base Camp of the Rocky Mountains"
- Location of the City of Gunnison in Gunnison County, Colorado.
- Coordinates: 38°32′53″N 106°55′29″W
- Country: United States
- State: Colorado
- County: Gunnison
- Incorporated: March 1, 1880
- Named for: John W. Gunnison

Government
  - Type: Home rule municipality

Area
  - Total: 4.849 sq mi (12.558 km^{2})
  - Land: 4.849 sq mi (12.558 km^{2})
  - Water: 0 sq mi (0.000 km^{2})
- Elevation: 7,710 ft (2,350 m)

Population (2020)
  - Total: 6,560
  - Density: 1,353/sq mi (522/km^{2})
- Time zone: UTC−07:00 (MST)
  - Summer (DST): UTC−06:00 (MDT)
- ZIP codes: 81230-81231 and 81247
- Area code: 970
- FIPS code: 08-33640
- GNIS feature ID: 2410674
- Website: www.gunnisonco.gov

Gunnison is a home rule municipality that is the county seat of and the most populous municipality in Gunnison County, Colorado, United States. The city population was 6,560 at the 2020 United States census. The city was named in honor of John W. Gunnison, a United States Army officer who surveyed for a transcontinental railroad in 1853. Gunnison is a college town, home to Western Colorado University.

== History ==
=== Founding ===
The City of Gunnison got its name from the first known European-American explorer of the area, John W. Gunnison. He was searching for a route for the transcontinental railroad in 1853 and only stayed for three days before traveling west to Utah. Gunnison saw its first population increase in the 1870s, due to the mining surge throughout the state. The railroad arrived soon after in 1880 to appreciative miners, ranchers, and farmers.

In the early 1800s, the groups moving into the Gunnison area were mainly fur trappers and mountain men, trying to make a living for themselves in the rocky mountain terrain. But a drop in fur prices in the 1840s essentially cut out the need for their jobs.

The late 1850s saw the start of people joining the hunt for gold in Gunnison county. Miners were in search of placer gold, but with the growing numbers of white men in the area, this brought conflict between the Ute tribes still around the county. At least several miners were killed by these tribes and this caused some of the miners to flee the area, caring more for their lives than potential gold bonanzas.

=== Late 19th century ===
With the mining boom, Gunnison began to see an increase of people around the 1870s. Along with the miners coming in, ranchers and farmers were among the others that led to the Ute people becoming forced out of the area. The mining camps in Gunnison and around the county reportedly produced about 130,000 ounces of gold from the beginning of the gold rush through 1959. At the start this was mostly from placer deposits, but the largest amounts were from a by-product of silver-lead ore. The largest deposits were found along the Taylor River, as well as the Tincup and the Washington Gulch districts.

Before the railroad reached Gunnison in 1880, there was a debate as to which railroad line would claim the town as their territory. The D&RG and DSP&P were both battling for control over the area. This split the town into two sides, both disagreeing as to where the railroad depots should be placed in town. The "old" and "new" sides of town ended up agreeing to disagree and were happy to have any railroad come through town. Both lines ended up coming through town anyway, although the DSP&P shortly discontinued service to Gunnison. The D&RG was later reorganized as the D&RGW railroad and was a prominent line to Gunnison for about seventy years; it served as the primary means of transportation for the townspeople into the 1950s.

Also in 1880, the cattle industry in Gunnison was established. Realizing the poor conditions for farming (with only about eleven inches of rainfall annually and the short growing season due to the high elevation and alpine environment) the local farmers turned to ranching and began breeding cattle. To do this effectively, they had to clear and level fields for grazing purposes. Irrigation ditches also had to be cut into the ground to properly irrigate the fields in order to grow hay for the horses and cattle. Many of these practices are still in use, which can be seen while driving through and around the town to various ranches still in operation.

John and William Outcalt were among the earliest settlers of Gunnison. They started their own ranch just north of town along the southeast bank of the Gunnison river. John Outcalt helped build the Paragon School, which is still standing today in the Gunnison Pioneer Society museum on the east end of town.

=== 20th and 21st centuries ===
Gunnison residents isolated themselves from the surrounding area during the Spanish Influenza epidemic for two months at the end of 1918. All highways were barricaded near the county lines. Train conductors warned all passengers that if they stepped outside of the train in Gunnison, they would be arrested and quarantined for five days. This served as partial inspiration for the novel The Last Town on Earth (2006) by Thomas Mullen. Although the isolation was at first successful at preventing transmission or deaths, the townspeople became restless after a few months, and the isolation was lifted in February 1919 only to have the flu arrive a month later, killing two people.

== Geography ==
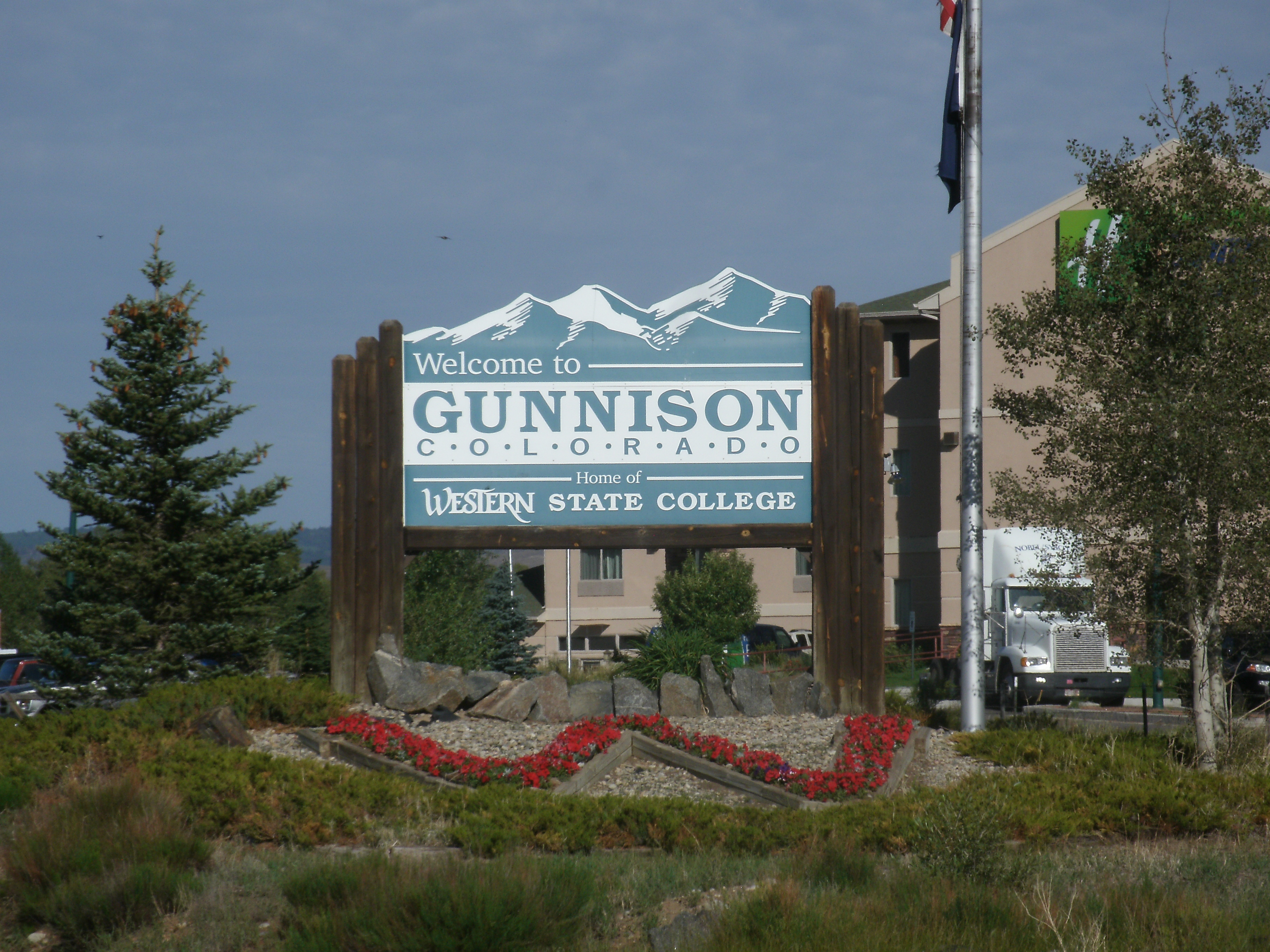
Welcome to Gunnison sign for travelers on Hwy 50 entering Gunnison from the east.

At the 2020 United States census, the town had a total area of 3,103 acres (12.558 km^{2}), all of it land. Gunnison is near Blue Mesa Reservoir. Primary access to Gunnison is from Salida to the east via Monarch Pass or from Montrose, Colorado, to the west via Cerro Summit on U.S. Highway 50. U.S. Highway 50 is the main east–west thoroughfare through the town. There are numerous other ways to get to Gunnison, some of which are subject to seasonal closures (Kebler Pass, Cottonwood Pass). At the 2010 Census there was a population of 15,324 within the county.

=== Climate ===
Gunnison is located at the bottom of a valley. Due to its location in the Rocky Mountains, cold air in all the valleys settles into Gunnison at night, making it one of the coldest places in winter in the United States, especially when snowpack is present.

The city typically experiences moderate snowfalls, with an average of 45.5 inches (116 cm) per year. Early fall and late spring snows are not uncommon, and snow can remain on the ground in town from as early as November to as late as April. Surrounding mountains experience very heavy snowfall with longer periods of snow on the ground. Many locations average 300–400 inches (760–1,020 cm) of snow annually. The snow is welcome to the area, as it is beneficial to water supplies and local ski resorts. Total liquid precipitation averages 10.6 inches (270 mm) per year in the city of Gunnison, while surrounding mountains may receive anywhere from 15 to over 40 inches (380 to 1,000 mm) annually, depending upon elevation and local topography.

According to the Köppen Climate Classification system, Gunnison has a warm-summer humid continental climate, abbreviated "Dfb" on climate maps. The hottest temperature recorded in Gunnison was 105 °F (41 °C) on August 3, 1894, while the coldest temperature recorded was −47 °F (−44 °C) on December 25, 1924.

Climate data for Gunnison, Colorado, 1991–2020 normals, extremes 1893–present
Month	Jan	Feb	Mar	Apr	May	Jun	Jul	Aug	Sep	Oct	Nov	Dec	Year
Record high °F (°C)	55 (13)	61 (16)	79 (26)	78 (26)	87 (31)	96 (36)	95 (35)	105 (41)	92 (33)	82 (28)	75 (24)	62 (17)	105 (41)
Mean maximum °F (°C)	41.1 (5.1)	45.7 (7.6)	58.9 (14.9)	70.5 (21.4)	78.4 (25.8)	84.9 (29.4)	87.2 (30.7)	84.4 (29.1)	80.5 (26.9)	73.0 (22.8)	59.5 (15.3)	45.4 (7.4)	86.6 (30.3)
Mean daily maximum °F (°C)	26.1 (−3.3)	30.4 (−0.9)	44.1 (6.7)	56.0 (13.3)	65.8 (18.8)	76.2 (24.6)	79.9 (26.6)	77.0 (25.0)	70.3 (21.3)	59.8 (15.4)	43.6 (6.4)	28.5 (−1.9)	54.8 (12.7)
Daily mean °F (°C)	9.8 (−12.3)	15.6 (−9.1)	29.0 (−1.7)	39.3 (4.1)	48.0 (8.9)	56.3 (13.5)	61.9 (16.6)	59.8 (15.4)	51.9 (11.1)	40.7 (4.8)	27.1 (−2.7)	12.8 (−10.7)	37.7 (3.2)
Mean daily minimum °F (°C)	−6.4 (−21.3)	0.7 (−17.4)	14.0 (−10.0)	22.7 (−5.2)	30.2 (−1.0)	36.5 (2.5)	43.9 (6.6)	42.6 (5.9)	33.6 (0.9)	21.7 (−5.7)	10.7 (−11.8)	−2.9 (−19.4)	20.6 (−6.3)
Mean minimum °F (°C)	−23.7 (−30.9)	−17.6 (−27.6)	−2.8 (−19.3)	11.3 (−11.5)	19.4 (−7.0)	28.0 (−2.2)	35.2 (1.8)	34.3 (1.3)	22.2 (−5.4)	9.1 (−12.7)	−5.9 (−21.1)	−21.0 (−29.4)	−26.8 (−32.7)
Record low °F (°C)	−45 (−43)	−44 (−42)	−29 (−34)	−14 (−26)	7 (−14)	15 (−9)	23 (−5)	24 (−4)	9 (−13)	−11 (−24)	−26 (−32)	−47 (−44)	−47 (−44)
Average precipitation inches (mm)	0.82 (21)	0.67 (17)	0.51 (13)	0.74 (19)	1.00 (25)	0.57 (14)	1.31 (33)	1.45 (37)	1.22 (31)	0.73 (19)	0.65 (17)	0.93 (24)	10.60 (269)
Average snowfall inches (cm)	11.1 (28)	9.0 (23)	4.4 (11)	3.5 (8.9)	0.6 (1.5)	0.0 (0.0)	0.0 (0.0)	0.0 (0.0)	0.2 (0.51)	1.2 (3.0)	5.2 (13)	10.3 (26)	45.5 (114.91)
Average precipitation days (≥ 0.01 in)	7.4	6.5	4.9	5.3	6.5	4.8	10.1	10.7	8.8	6.1	5.1	6.4	82.6
Average snowy days (≥ 0.1 in)	8.2	7.1	4.2	3.1	0.6	0.0	0.0	0.0	0.0	1.1	4.0	7.2	35.5
Source 1: NOAA
Source 2: National Weather Service

== Demographics ==
Historical population
Census	Pop.	Note	%±
1880	888		—
1890	1,105		24.4%
1900	1,200		8.6%
1910	1,026		−14.5%
1920	1,329		29.5%
1930	1,415		6.5%
1940	2,177		53.9%
1950	2,770		27.2%
1960	3,477		25.5%
1970	4,613		32.7%
1980	5,785		25.4%
1990	4,636		−19.9%
2000	5,409		16.7%
2010	5,854		8.2%
2020	6,560		12.1%
U.S. Decennial Census

=== 2020 census ===
As of the 2020 census, Gunnison had a population of 6,560. The median age was 28.4 years. 15.1% of residents were under the age of 18 and 10.5% of residents were 65 years of age or older. For every 100 females there were 113.7 males, and for every 100 females age 18 and over there were 115.8 males age 18 and over.

98.7% of residents lived in urban areas, while 1.3% lived in rural areas.

There were 2,564 households in Gunnison, of which 22.0% had children under the age of 18 living in them. Of all households, 32.4% were married-couple households, 30.6% were households with a male householder and no spouse or partner present, and 26.6% were households with a female householder and no spouse or partner present. About 35.9% of all households were made up of individuals and 10.0% had someone living alone who was 65 years of age or older.

There were 2,831 housing units, of which 9.4% were vacant. The homeowner vacancy rate was 1.6% and the rental vacancy rate was 6.0%.

Racial composition as of the 2020 census
Race	Number	Percent
White	5,323	81.1%
Black or African American	70	1.1%
American Indian and Alaska Native	113	1.7%
Asian	62	0.9%
Native Hawaiian and Other Pacific Islander	3	0.0%
Some other race	466	7.1%
Two or more races	523	8.0%
Hispanic or Latino (of any race)	987	15.0%

=== 2010 census ===
As of the 2010 census, there were 5,854 people, 2,318 households, and 991 families residing in the city. The population density was 1,829.4 inhabitants per square mile (706.3/km^{2}). There were 2,645 total housing units at an average density of 826.6 units per square mile (319.2 units/km^{2}). The racial makeup of the city was 86.9% White, 0.6% African American, 2.4% Native American, 0.6% Asian, 0% Pacific Islander, 6.6% from other races, and 2.8% from two or more races. Hispanic or Latino of any race were 14.2% of the population.

There were 2,318 households, out of which 20.6% had children under the age of 18 living with them, 30.6% were married couples living together, 7.1% had a female householder with no husband present, and 57.2% were non-families. 34.9% of all households were made up of individuals, and 7.2% had someone living alone who was 65 years of age or older. The average household size was 2.2 and the average family size was 2.9.

In the city, the population breakdown was 26.1% under the age of 19, 23.4% from 20 to 24, 26.1% from 25 to 44, 16.8% from 45 to 64, and 7.6% who were 65 years of age or older. The median age was 25.2 years. For every 100 females, there were 120.1 males. For every 100 females age 18 and over, there were 128 males.

=== Income and poverty ===
The median income for a household in the city was $39,181, and the median income for a family was $59,836. Males had a median income of $35,818 versus $28,476 for females. The per capita income for the city was $17,776. 18.9% of families and 30.6% of the population were below the poverty line, including 42.2% of those under age 18 and 16.6% of those age 65 or over.

== Education ==
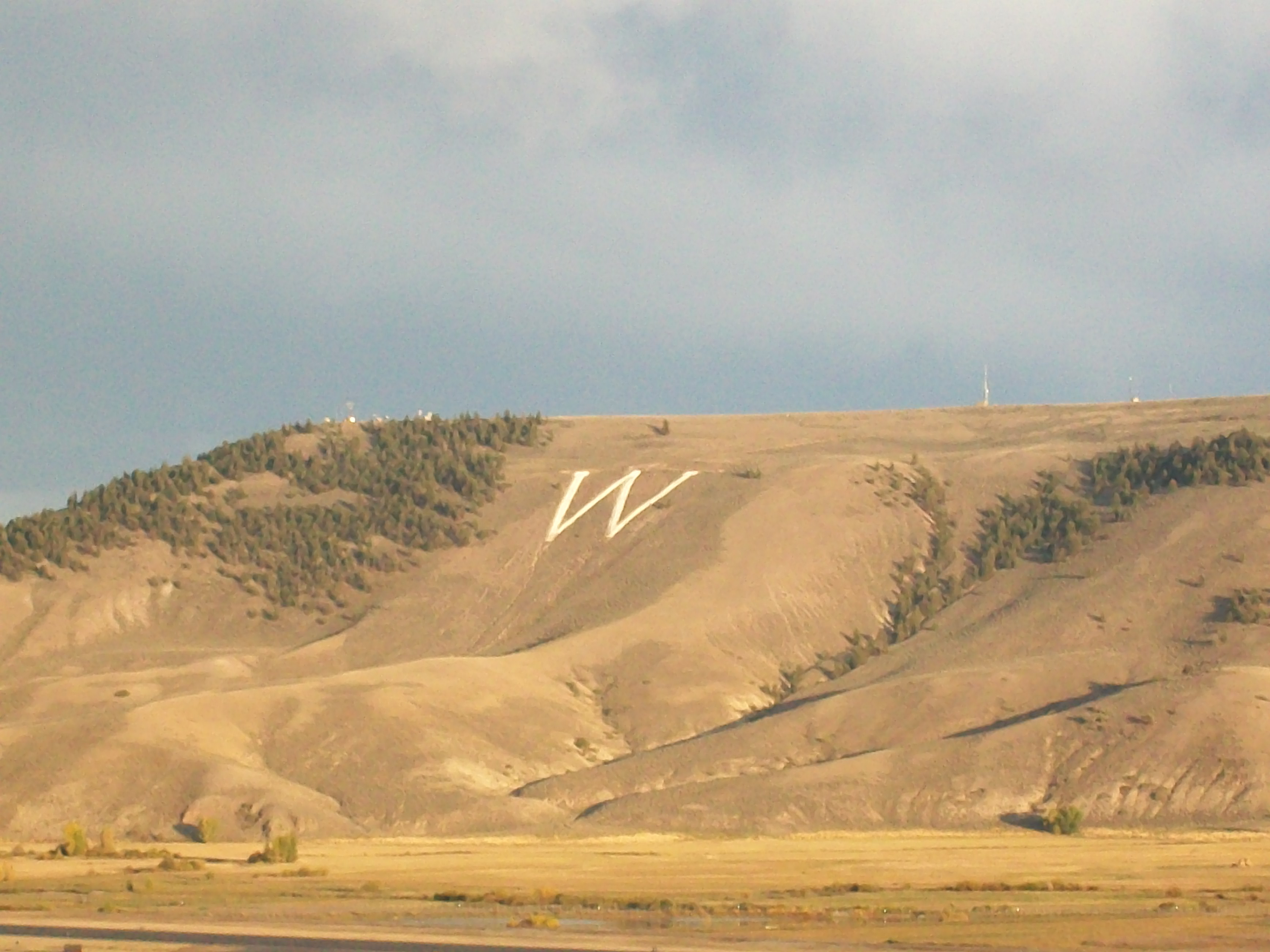
View of Tenderfoot Mountain taken from Gunnison in September 2009. The "W" signifies Western Colorado University.

Gunnison is home to Western Colorado University which received its third renaming since its beginnings from an approval of Governor John Wright Hickenlooper on August 1, 2012. The college was founded as The Colorado State Normal School for Children by a bill signed on April 16, 1901, by Governor James B. Orman. In 1923, the college's name was changed to Western State College of Colorado because its role expanded from a teaching institution to a liberal arts college. Historical papers in the Leslie Savage Library on campus state that the school was the first liberal arts college on the Western Slope of Colorado.

The Gunnison Valley is also served by the Gunnison Watershed RE1J School District which includes Public and Non Public schools. The public schools in the RE1J school district are located in Crested Butte and Gunnison; Marble Charter School is located in the Statutory Town of Marble in northwest Gunnison County. Public Schools in Gunnison Watershed RE1J School District:

- Gunnison Elementary School
- Gunnison Kindergarten at Lake School
- Gunnison Middle School
- Gunnison High School
- Crested Butte Community School
- Gunnison Pre-School
- Marble Charter School

The law concerning non public schools, 22–33–104, C.R.S., requires that a sequential program of instruction be provided by an independent or parochial school. Such program shall include, but not be limited to, communication skills of reading, writing, and speaking, mathematics, history, civics, literature, and science. Some of the non-public schools in Gunnison County adhering to these C.R.S. are:

- Little Red Schoolhouse
- Paradise Place
- Stepping Stones Children Center
- Tenderfoot CFDC

== Media ==
Gunnison's newspaper, Gunnison Country Times, is published weekly. There are also various radio stations that serve the area, including KWSB-FM (91.1), which is affiliated with Western Colorado University. KBUT of Crested Butte also simulcasts NPR broadcasts at 90.3 FM.

=== In film ===
The 1902 silent film short The Girls in the Overalls directed by Harry Buckwalter is set on the Vidal Ranch in Gunnison.

Gunnison County is the setting of the science fiction film Aliens vs. Predator: Requiem, although the film was actually shot in the towns of Port Coquitlam and Port Moody, British Columbia. The film ends with the town being destroyed by a nuclear bomb.

== Transportation ==
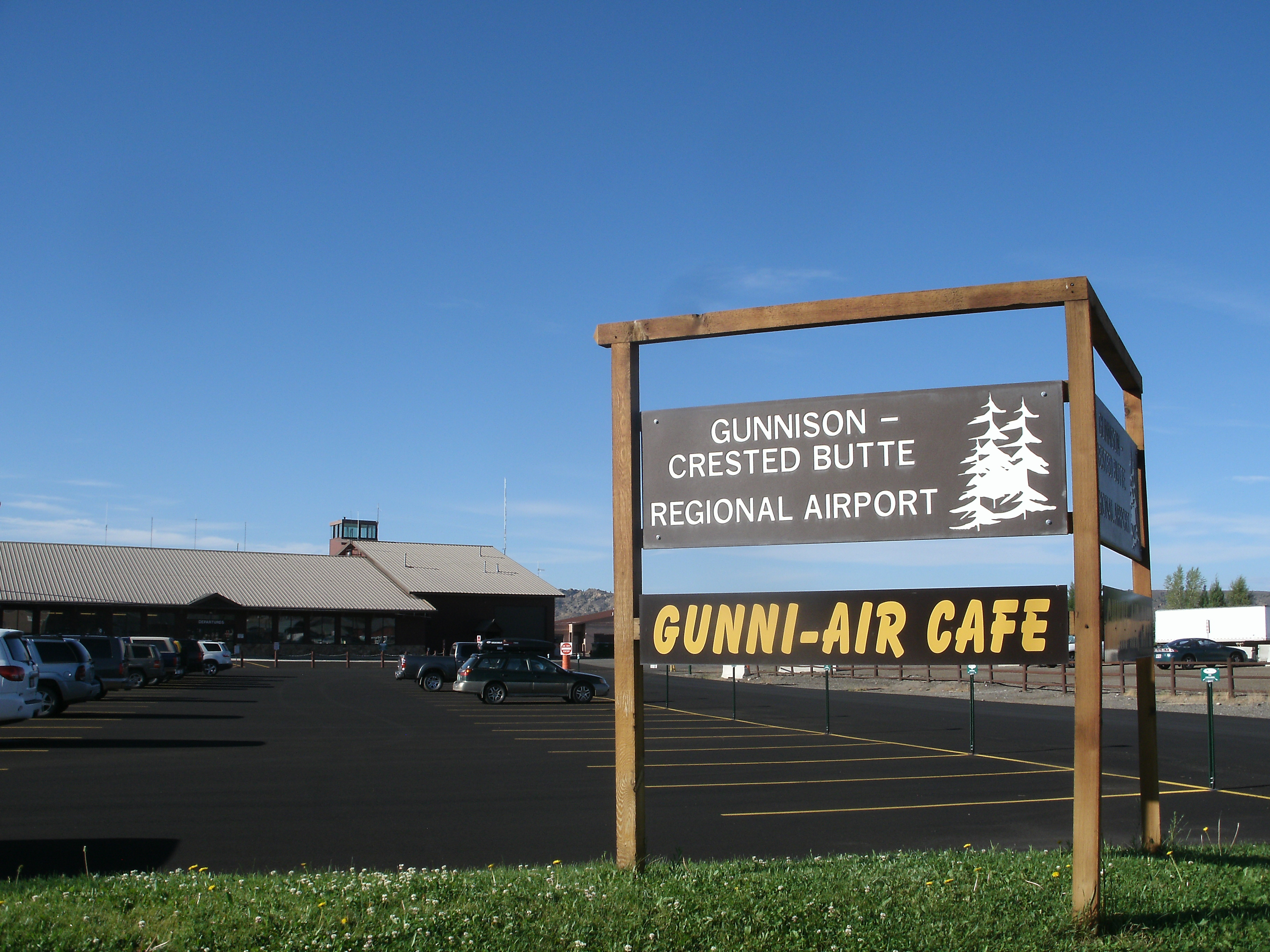
Gunnison–Crested Butte Regional Airport

The Gunnison–Crested Butte Regional Airport serves the valley and nearby Crested Butte with both commercial airline and general aviation flights. Gunnison Valley Rural Transportation Authority (RTA) operates bus service between Gunnison and Crested Butte serving Western Colorado University and Crested Butte Mountain Resort. Gunnison is part of the statewide Bustang system, which connects the town to Denver.

The League of American Bicyclists has awarded Gunnison the silver level in bicycle friendliness.

== Activities ==
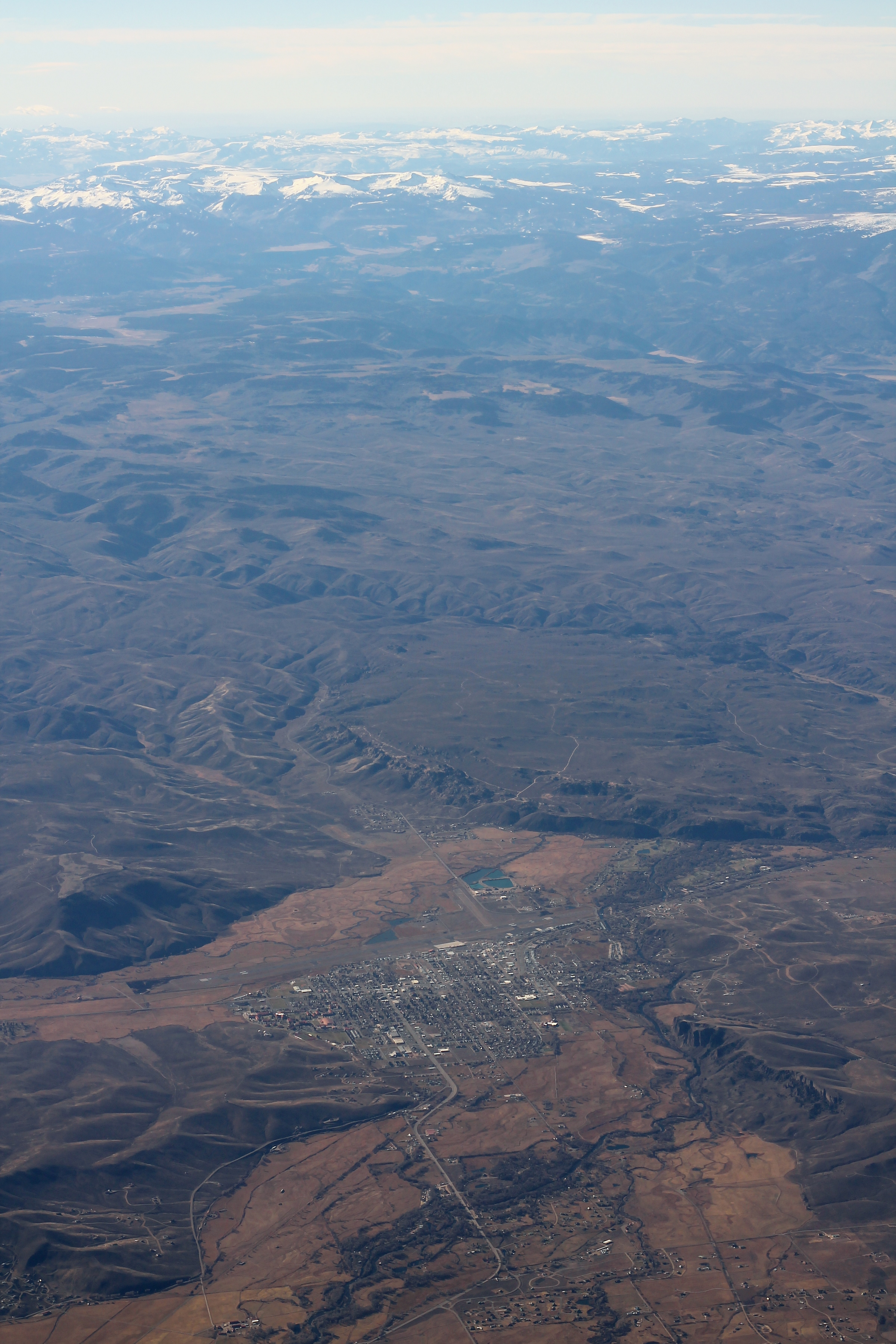
An aerial view of Gunnison.

=== Winter ===
Winter activities for Gunnison include skiing at Crested Butte Mountain Resort, skiing at Monarch Ski Area, snowmobiling, cross country skiing, back country skiing, ice fishing, ice skating, hunting, and snowshoeing.

=== Summer ===
Activities during the summer in Gunnison include fishing on the Gunnison River, Tomichi Creek and Blue Mesa Reservoir. Hiking in any of the numerous areas within a short distance of town like Curecanti National Recreation Area, Tomichi State Wildlife Area, Sapinero State Wildlife Area, McIntosh State Wildlife Area. Biking activities include road biking and mountain biking; Hartman Rocks has many bike trails for mountain biking as well as motocross and rock climbing. One rafting practice is to rent a raft in Almont and drift 10 miles (16 km) down the Gunnison River to the town of Gunnison. Below the Hwy 50 bridge on the Gunnison river is the whitewater park. The Gunnison Ranger District Office located at 216 North Colorado Street offers maps and information about details particular to vehicle access, private, BLM, federal and state properties, trails, and other areas of interest.

Gunnison also hosts festivals and farmers markets during the summer months.

=== Cattlemen's Days ===
A rodeo in Colorado takes place over a 10-day period in July featuring PRCA Rodeo activities as well as family-based activities. Cattlemen's Days celebrated its 112th year of rich western heritage in a first class and nationally recognized rodeo event for the year 2012. In 2011, this rodeo was nominated as one of the five finalists for Mid-sized rodeo of the year. It continues to be a leader in PCRA rodeos in fund-raising for breast cancer with their Tough enough to wear pink campaign. Cattlemen's Days also offers scholarships to support and further the education of 4-H and FFA exhibitors.

== Notable people ==
- Donna Anderson (born 1939), actress
- Susan DeMattei (born 1962), U.S. Olympic cyclist
- Rebecca Dussault (born 1980), U.S. Olympic cross country skiing
- Elva Dryer (born 1971), U.S. Olympic long-distance runner
- Patricia Elliott (1938–2015), actress
- Dan Gibbs (born 1976), Colorado state legislator
- Martin Hatcher (1927–2023), Colorado state senator and college professor
- Herschel M. Hogg (1853–1934), U.S. Representative from Colorado
- Sally Jacobsen (c. 1947–2017), journalist, first woman to serve as international editor of the Associated Press
- Ila Mae McAfee (1897–1995), painter, illustrator
- Aaron Simpson (born 1974), mixed martial arts fighter

== See also ==
- Curecanti National Recreation Area
- Old Spanish National Historic Trail
