= Gunnison High School =

Location
- 800 West Ohio Avenue; Gunnison, Colorado 81230; United States; 38°32′54″N 106°56′15″W

Information
- Type: Public high school
- Opened: 1902 (124 years ago)
- School district: Gunnison Watershed School District
- Superintendent: Leslie Nichols
- CEEB code: 060720
- Principal: Jim Woytek
- Teaching staff: 22.88 (on an FTE basis)
- Grades: 9-12
- Enrollment: 410 (2024-2025)
- Student to teacher ratio: 17.92
- Colors: Red and black
- Nickname: Cowboys
- Website: gunnisonhigh.gunnisonschools.net

Gunnison High School is a public high school located in Gunnison, Colorado.

== History ==
The district's first high school was established in 1882, and it was officially named Gunnison High School in 1902. The current school building was built in 1965.

== Demographics ==
The demographic breakdown of the 394 students enrolled in the 2019-20 school year was:

- Male - 49.0%
- Female - 51.0%
- Asian - 0.8%
- Hispanic - 21.1%
- White - 75.9%
- Multiracial - 2.2%

41 1% of the students were eligible for free or reduced-cost lunch.

== Athletics ==
The Assistant Principal, Dave Uhrig serves additionally as the athletic director. Gunnison's athletic teams are nicknamed the Cowboys and the school's colors are red and black. Gunnison teams compete in the following sports:

- Baseball
- Boys Golf
- Boys Basketball
- Cross Country
- Football
- Girls Basketball
- Girls Golf
- Mountain Biking
- Rock Climbing
- Swimming
- Softball
- Track & Field
- Volleyball
- Wrestling

=== State championships ===
- Boys Track
  - 2003 Colorado 3A State Champions
  - 2005 Colorado 3A State Champions
- Girls Cross Country
  - 1997 Colorado 3A State Champions
- Girls Track
  - 1976 Colorado 2A State Champions
  - 1991 Colorado 2A State Champions
  - 1992 Colorado 2A State Champions
- Wrestling
  - 1964 Colorado 2A State Champions
