= Darktown Comics =

Lithograph series produced by Currier and Ives

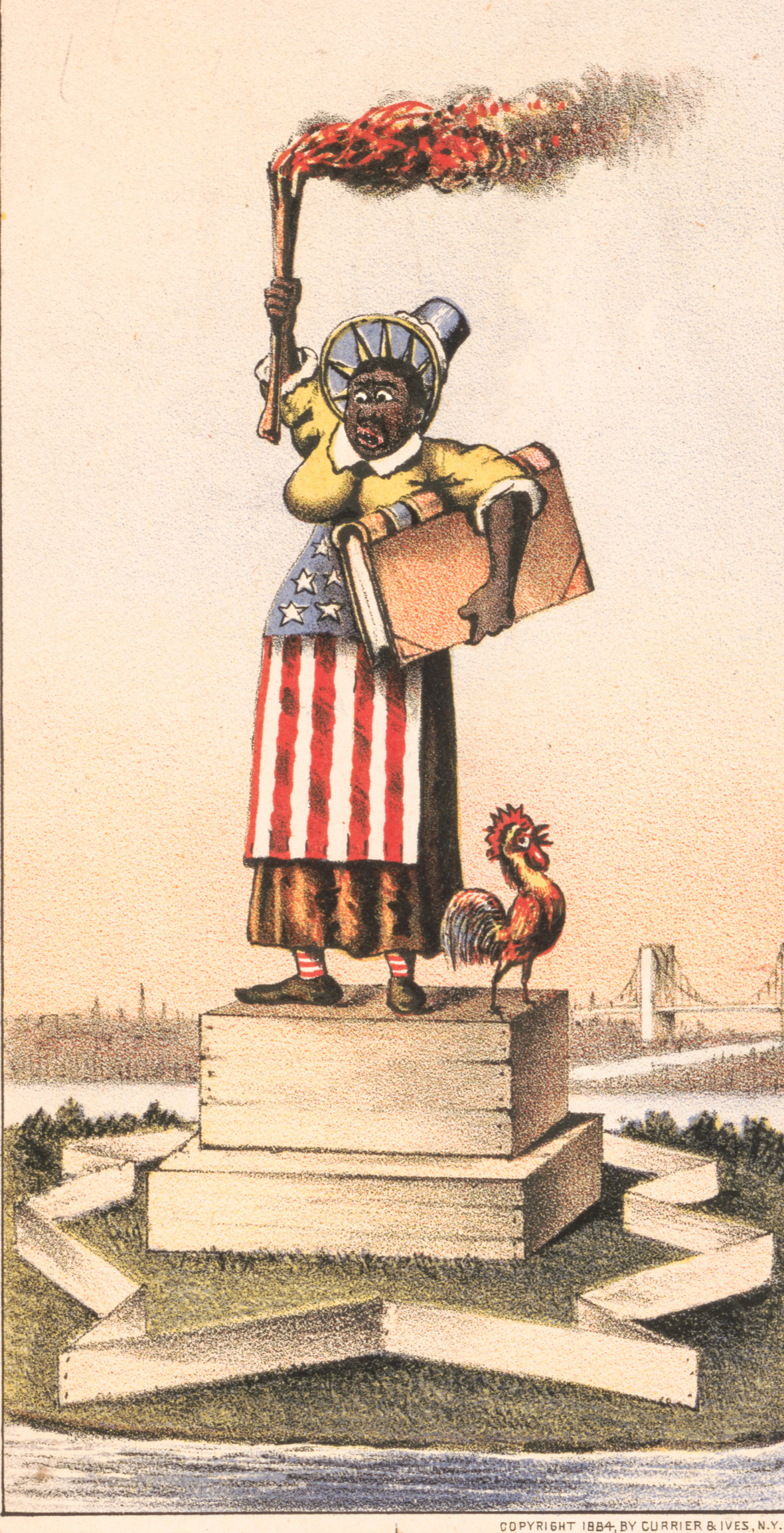
"Liberty frightening the world"

Darktown Comics is a series of Currier and Ives prints first produced in the 1870s that depicted racist vignettes ostensibly portraying a Black American town. It was a perennial bestseller for the New York-based firm, with some prints selling 73,000 copies via pushcarts and country stores, and all of them becoming bestsellers. The series represented one-third of Currier and Ives' production by 1884.

== Background ==
The Darktown Comics "drew heavily" from earlier representations in the Harper's Weekly Blackville series by Sol Eytinge.

Currier and Ives, because they were targeting a middle-class American customer, inadvertently created a "pictorial record" of values in the United States in the 19th century. Prominent collector Harry Peters called the lithographs "mirrors of the national taste, weather vanes of popular opinion, reflectors of American attitudes". Albert Baragwanath said the body of work "remains a true documentation of the latter half of the nineteenth century -- a rich pageant interpreted with the morality and prejudice of the day." According to Baragwanath, of the approximately 500 "comic prints" produced by Currier and Ives, "more than half of these were the so-called Darktown Comics who humor lay in gross burlesque."

According to Marcy Sacks of Albion College, the Darktown representations "lampooned black people in order to discredit the urban migration of southern blacks" to rationalize northern Americans' withdrawal from reconstructionist ideals. In the early pre-Civil War period prints typically alternated between representing happy, contented enslaved people with representing the horrific conditions for enslaved people; Black people were portrayed in propagandistic ways in support of certain political agendas rather than as people with their own concerns. As the Civil War drew nearer, Black people were represented as "the cause of sectional politics" and finally of the war itself. During the war, "respect for Negroes rose together with the hostility against the white southerner," and Black people were portrayed as helping Union soldiers and spying for the Union.

In the post-war period portrayals returned to those of people "completely incapable of advancing beyond their previous condition of servitude". The Darktown Comics, first published in the early-to-mid 1870s, represent this final period. According to J. Michael Martinez, "The central message was clear: Negroes were incapable of performing even the simplest of tasks or engaging in ordinary social intercourse without lapsing into idiocy or violence."

According to Imprint, the journal of the American Historical Print Collectors Society, the series "played an important role in the political and cultural debates over the rights and the status of African Americans in the last quarter of the nineteenth century", drawing on minstrelsy and plantation literature.

Few of the lithographs have been represented in collections and exhibitions. In 1997 a Currier & Ives exhibit at the Baltimore Museum of Art included "The Darktown Fire Brigade -- Saved" (1884), depicting Black firefighters who can't see a fire in front of them, and "De Cake Walk" (1884), depicting three women in outlandish clothing performing a dance common among Black entertainers of the time.

== Depictions ==
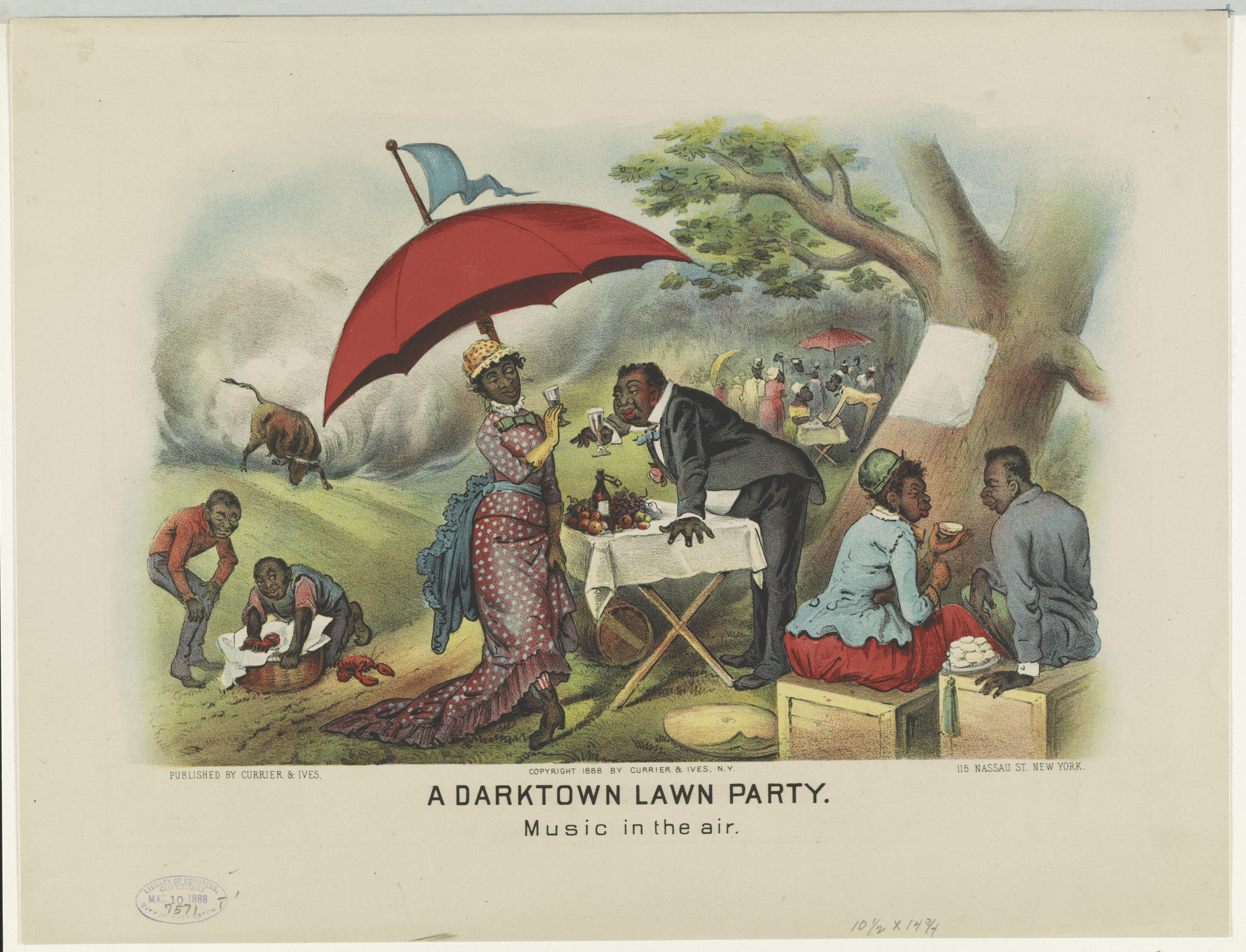
A Darktown Lawn Party: Music in the Air

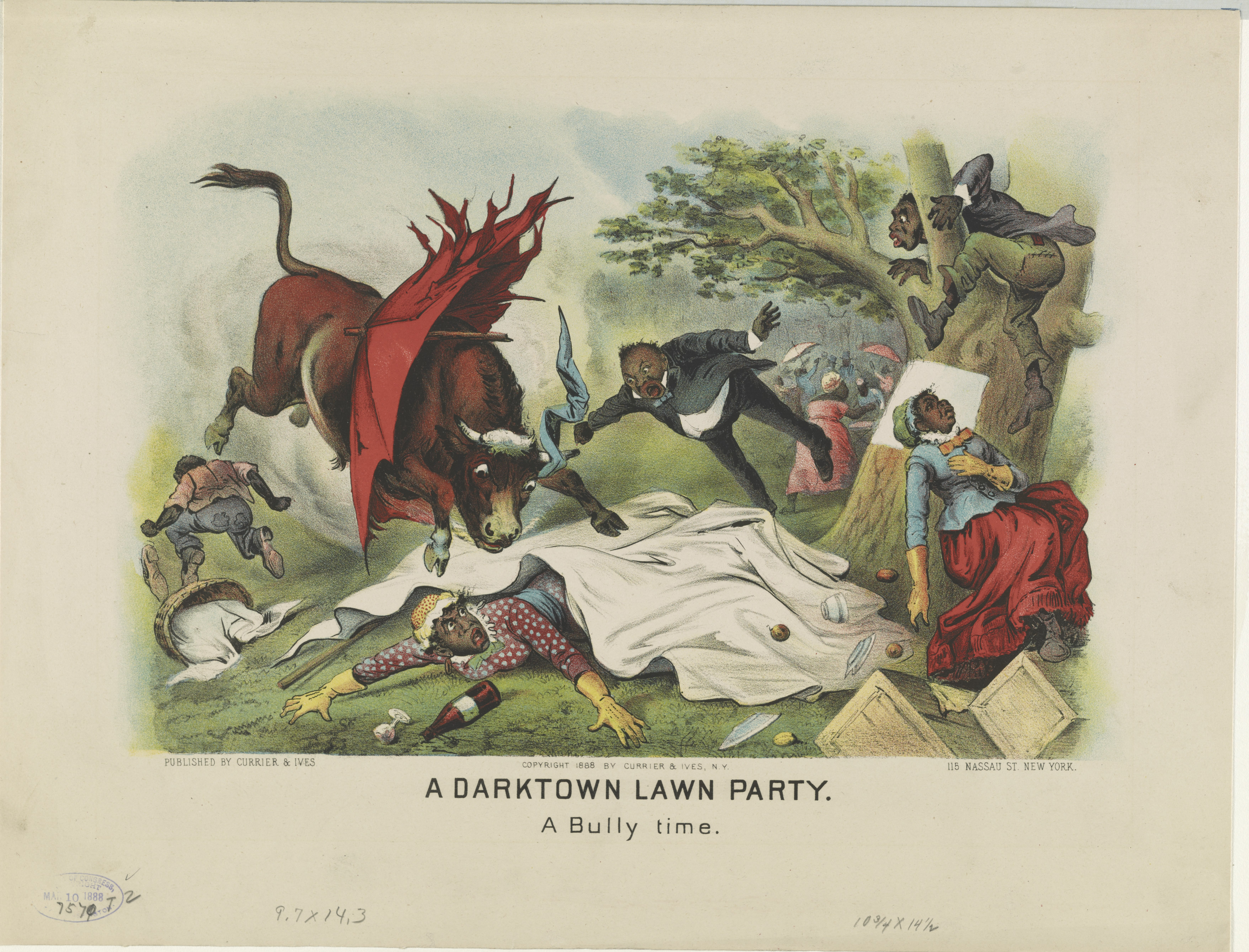
A Darktown Lawn Party: A Bully Time

The Darktown Comics consists of 100 to 200 racist prints "ridiculing African Americans" created and produced between the 1870s and the 1890s. The series depicts Black Americans as "a kinky-haired, thick-lipped, wide-eyed, simian creature that could not even pretend to live like white Americans." Bryan Le Beau calls this "the position to which most late nineteenth-century Americans were retreating".

Often the series presents Black people as attempting and failing, in scenarios intended to be humorous, to "rise above their station" in imitation of Whites. For example, a common Currier & Ives print subject is fine horses and elegant horsemanship; in the Darktown Comics, Black people are shown riding mules, donkeys, and "broken-down nags". Other series show Black people playing popular sports and games or hunting and fishing or attending the opera or performing jobs, all incompetently.

Black women are depicted with "huge feet...stuffed into delicate shoes"; the lithographs ridicule the idea that Black women can be beautiful, graceful, or stylish. In the "A Darktown Lawn Party" duo, a group of Black people is depicted engaging in an elegant lawn party, an entertainment popular at the time, under a tree, oblivious to a bull pawing the turf visible in the distance, in the first vignette. In the second, the bull has charged, and the lawn party is in disarray; the implication being that in an attempt to imitate Whites, Black people are too stupid to notice they're having their party in a field that contains a bull.

The lithographs represent Black Americans "as racist caricatures and ugly stereotypes" showing Black people as "backward, inept, and unable to adapt", according to the Smithsonian. The artists include John Cameron and Thomas Worth. According to the Smithsonian,

They drew on a broad visual vocabulary of anti-black racist tropes that had developed over the 19th century, derogatory signifiers that would have been understood and shared by their popular audience, who created a demand for similar imagery in numerous other commercial and decorative objects of the time. Cameron and Worth often set hapless black figures in traditionally white roles, such as firefighting, and the ridiculous failures they depicted helped to reinforce entrenched racial and social hierarchies, as well as to perpetuate the notions of heroism and leadership as white male prerogatives in the period after Reconstruction.

Worth's "more obvious exaggerations" include portraying Black people with "big mouths, large feet and hands, and sloping foreheads (meant to indicate limited intelligence)".

Cameron reworked the Worth drawings before they were lithographed; notes to Cameron from one of the partners on Worth's original drawings include instructions to "let the woman's foot come between the mule's forefoot so as to show his brace against here better. The child is meant to be wrapped up in a mattress" on the Worth drawing for "A Mule Team on an Up Grade."

J. Michael Martinez in his 2016 A Long Dark Night, described the prints as "among the earliest and most popular series of sketches depicting Negroes in the 1880s and 1890s" with sets of "before-and-after scene[s] depicting the buffoonery of Negroes". According to Martinez,

The first panel showed blacks engaged in some common activity -- playing sports, arguing politics, driving a team of horses, attending a party, and so forth. The supposed humor sprang from the second panel. The sporting event collapsed into anarchy, the political discussion degenerated into fisticuffs, the team of horses was derailed, or the party became a disastrous brouhaha. The central message was clear: Negroes were incapable of performing even the simplest of common tasks or engaging in ordinary social intercourse without lapsing into idiocy or violence.

== Themes ==
=== Firefighting ===
Currier & Ives were particularly known for their romanticized depictions of firefighters. According to Le Beau their lithographs of Black firefighters are "not so romanticized". Their depictions of Black firefighters, which consisted of 16 separate prints produced between 1884 and 1891 when many cities were appointing their first Black firefighters, were entitled The Darktown Fire Brigade and The Darktown Hook and Ladder Corps. Black firefighters were depicted using absurd homemade equipment, and again incompetently. Some in the series "seem to burlesque" more serious Currier & Ives prints on the same topic, according to Harry Peters.

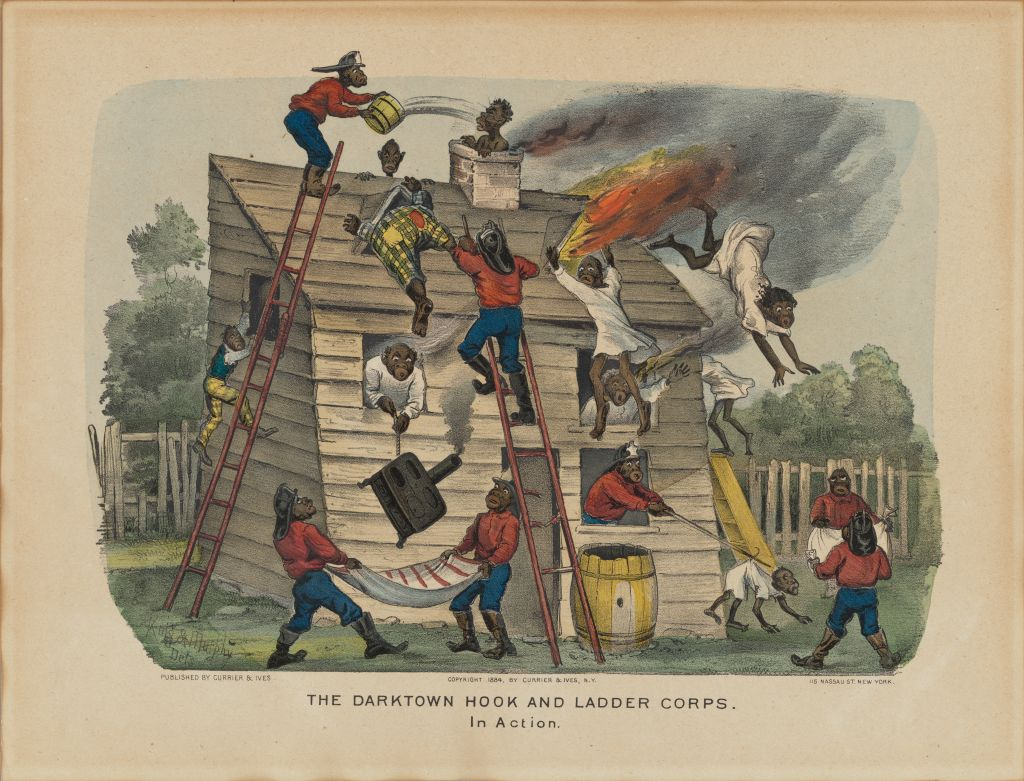
Darktown Hook and Ladder Corps: In Action

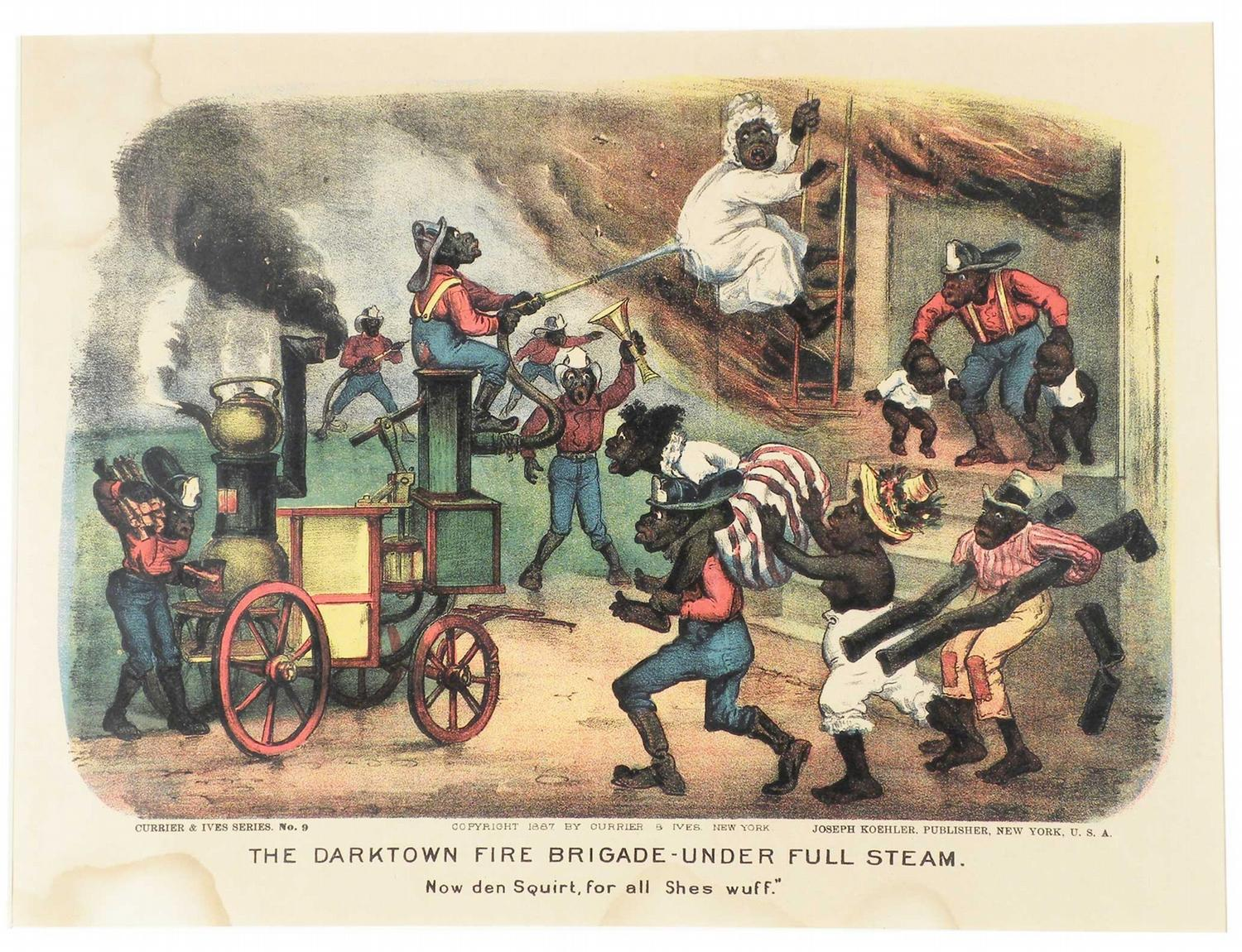
Darktown Fire Brigade: Under Full Steam

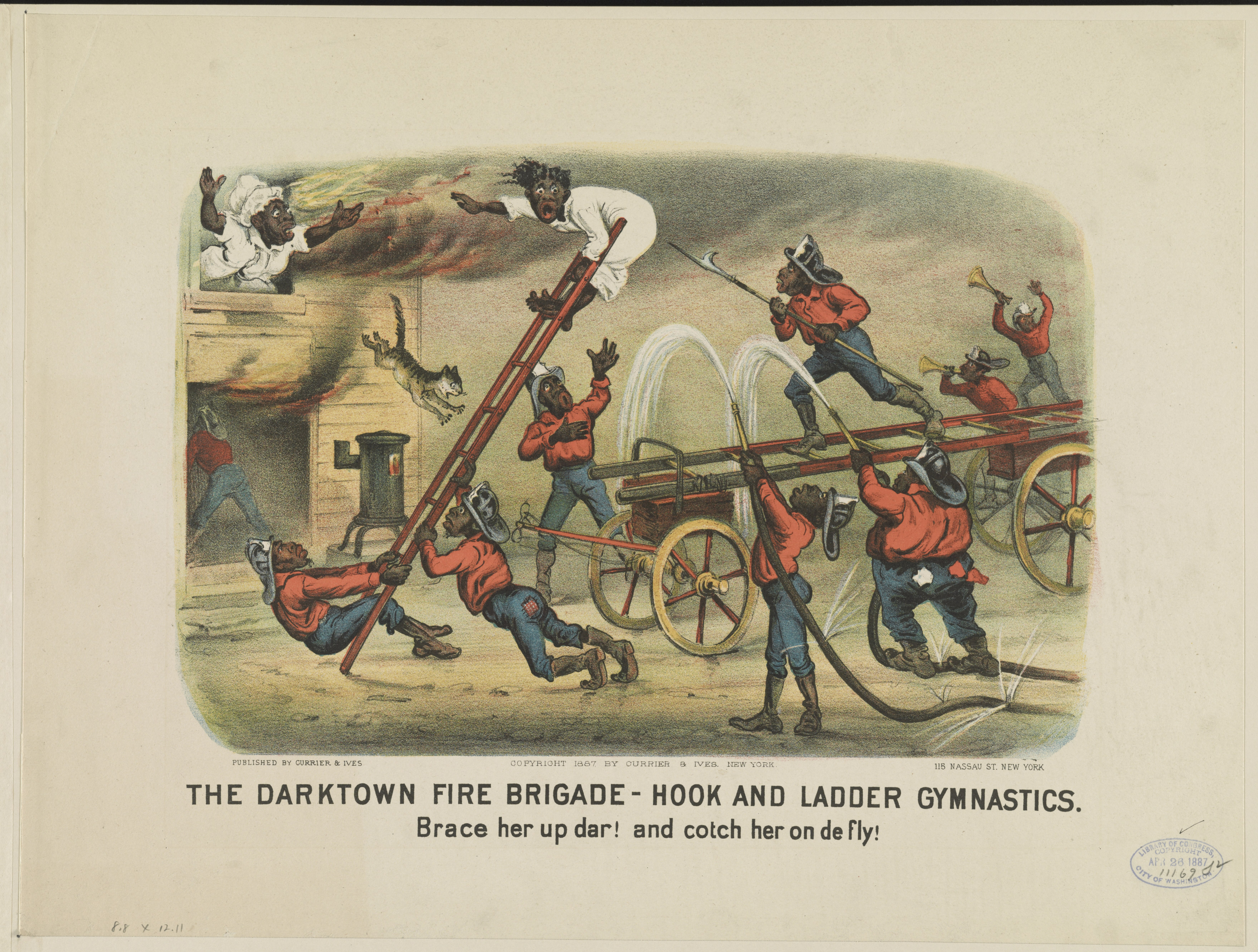
Darktown Fire Brigade: Hook and Ladder Gymnastics

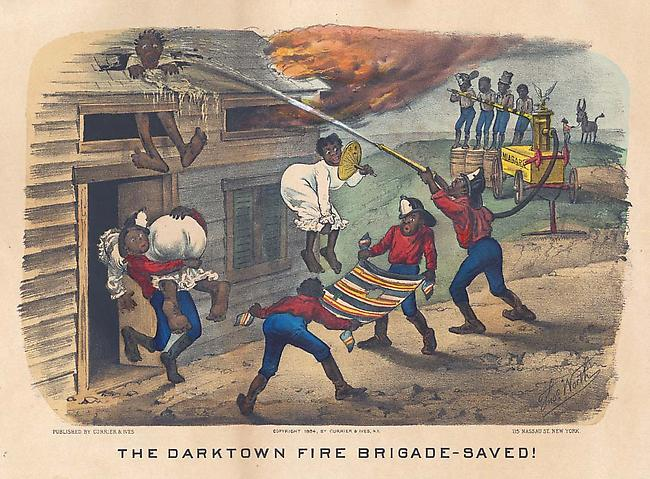
Darktown Fire Brigade: Saved!

=== Marriage and courting ===
Currier and Ives published many lithographs "extolling the virtues of marriage and virtuous courting". According to Le Beau, "Black courting and marriage, as seen through Currier and Ives, was a different experience." As with many of the two-scene vignettes, Black people who attempt to engage in such normal behavior as courting and marrying often end in chaos or comic scenes.

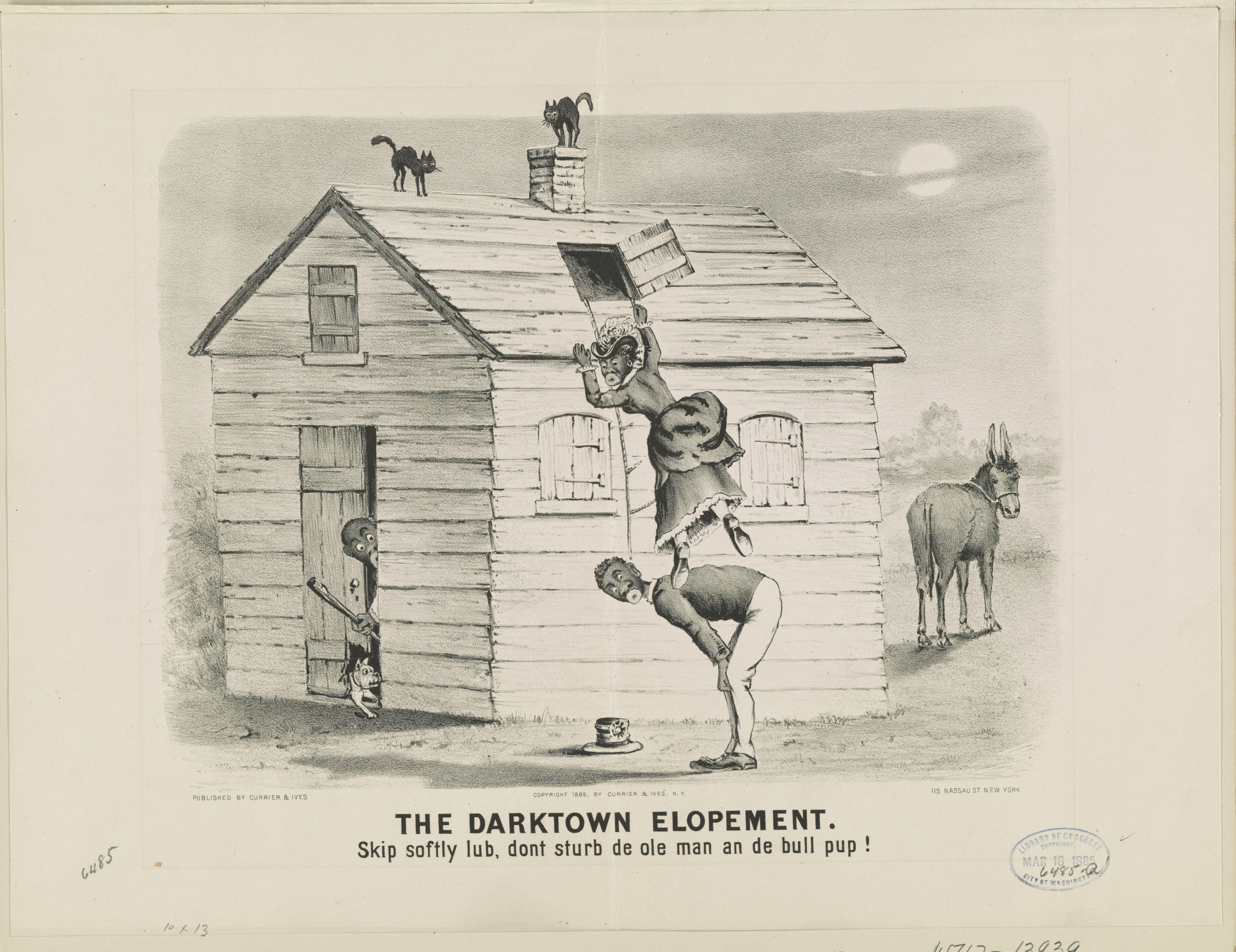
Vignette 1 of 2

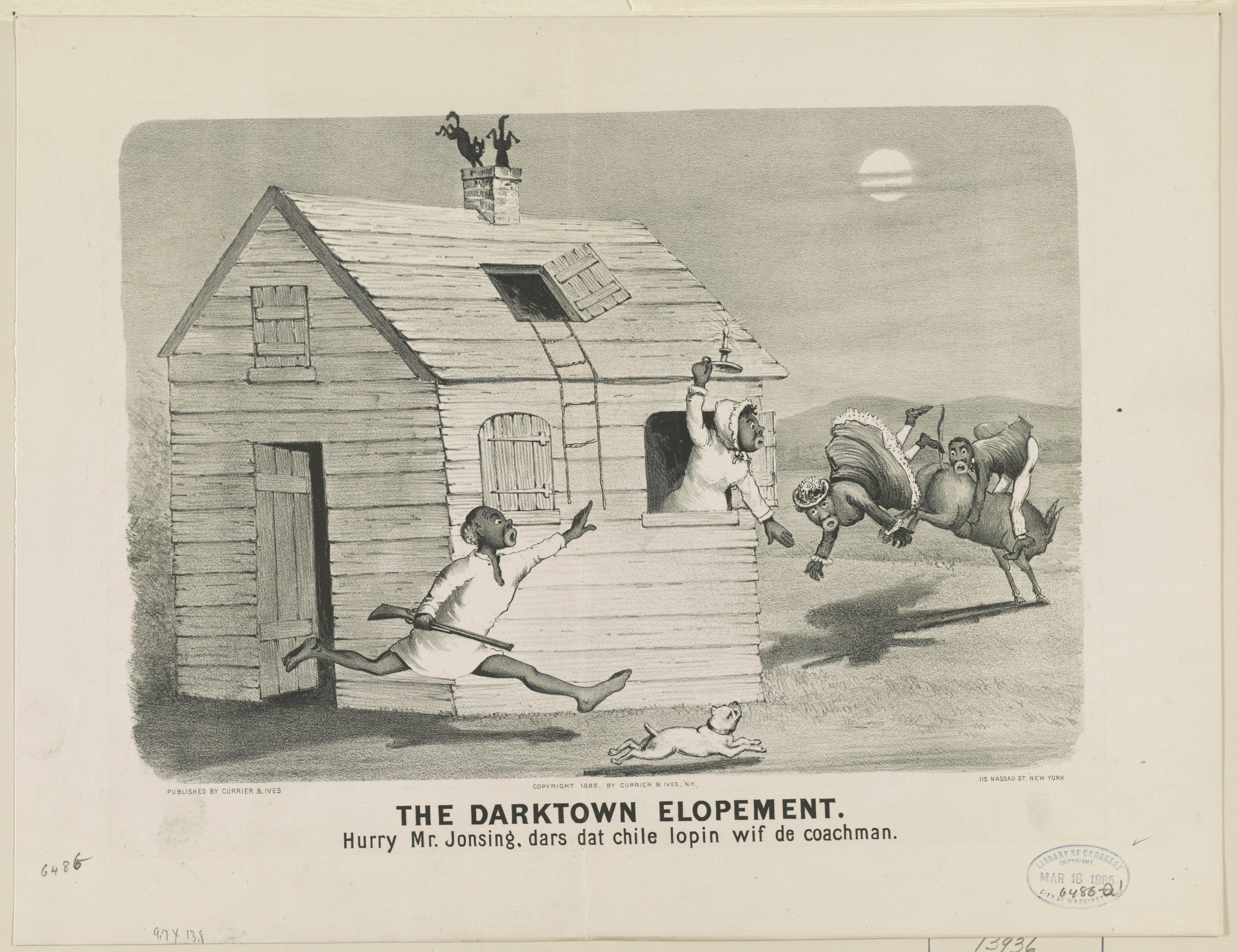
Vignette 2 of 2

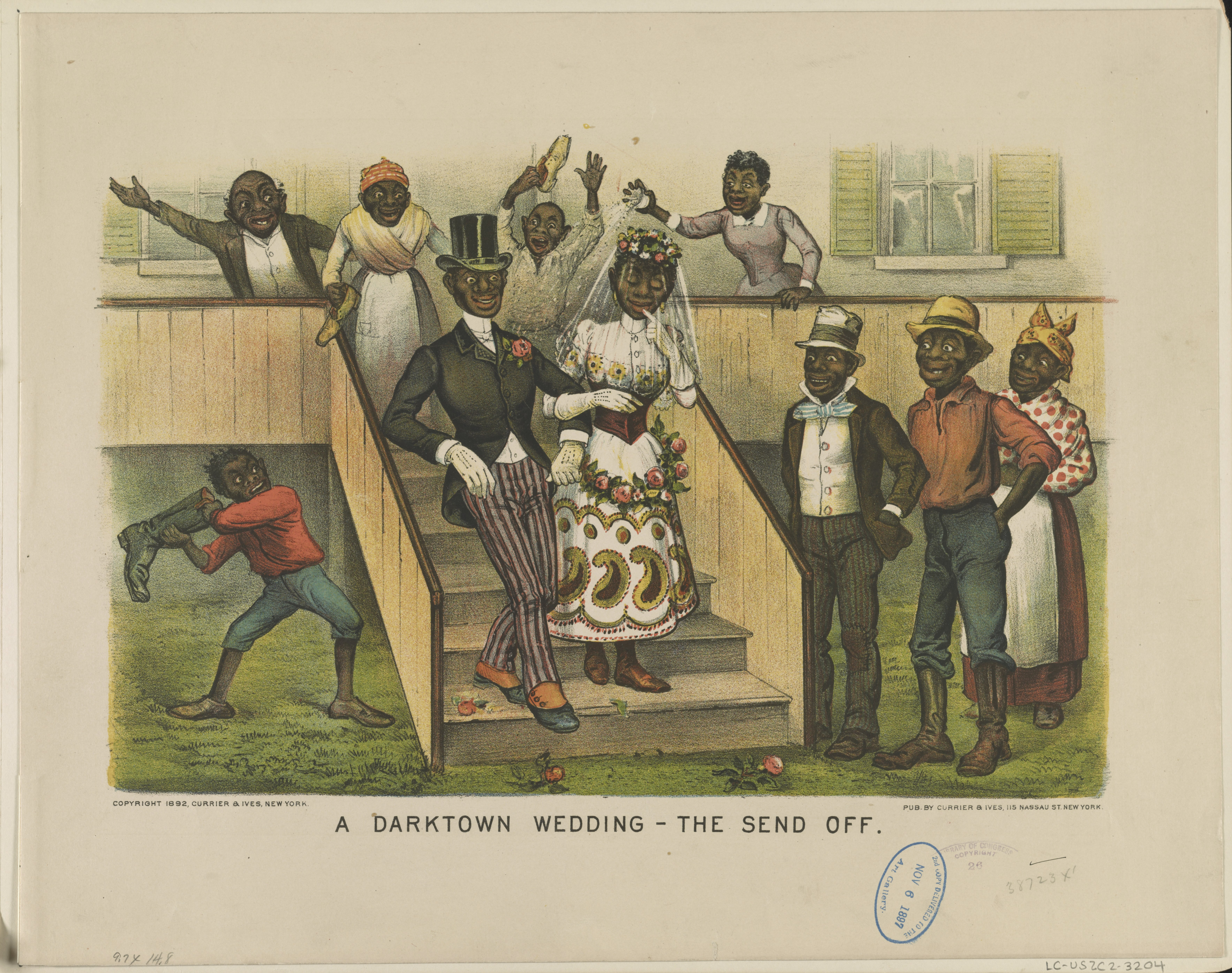
Newly married couple (vignette 1 of 2)

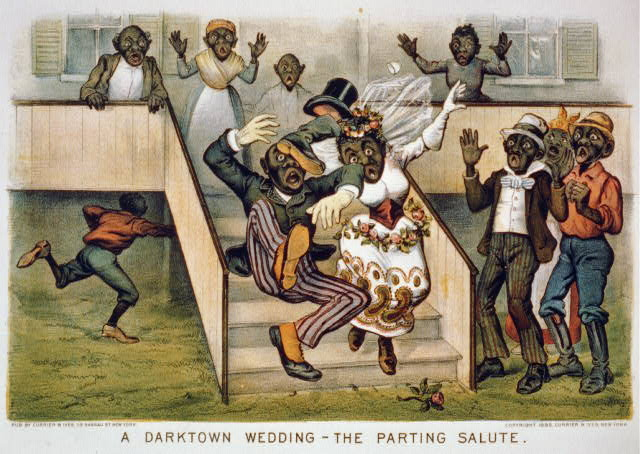
Newly married couple (vignette 2 or 2)

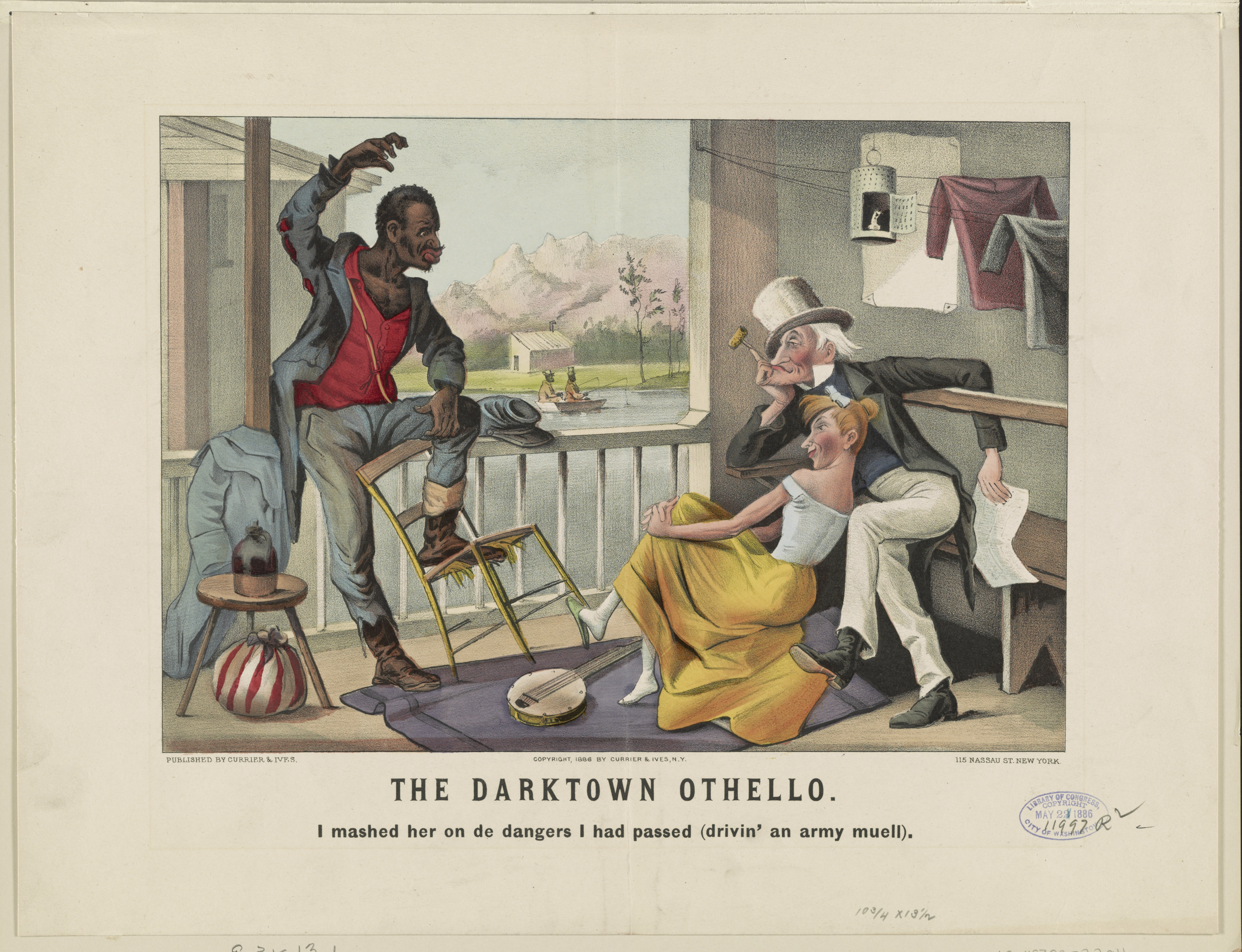
The Darktown Othello

=== Watermelons and banjos ===
Common themes in Darktown Comics are watermelons and banjos.

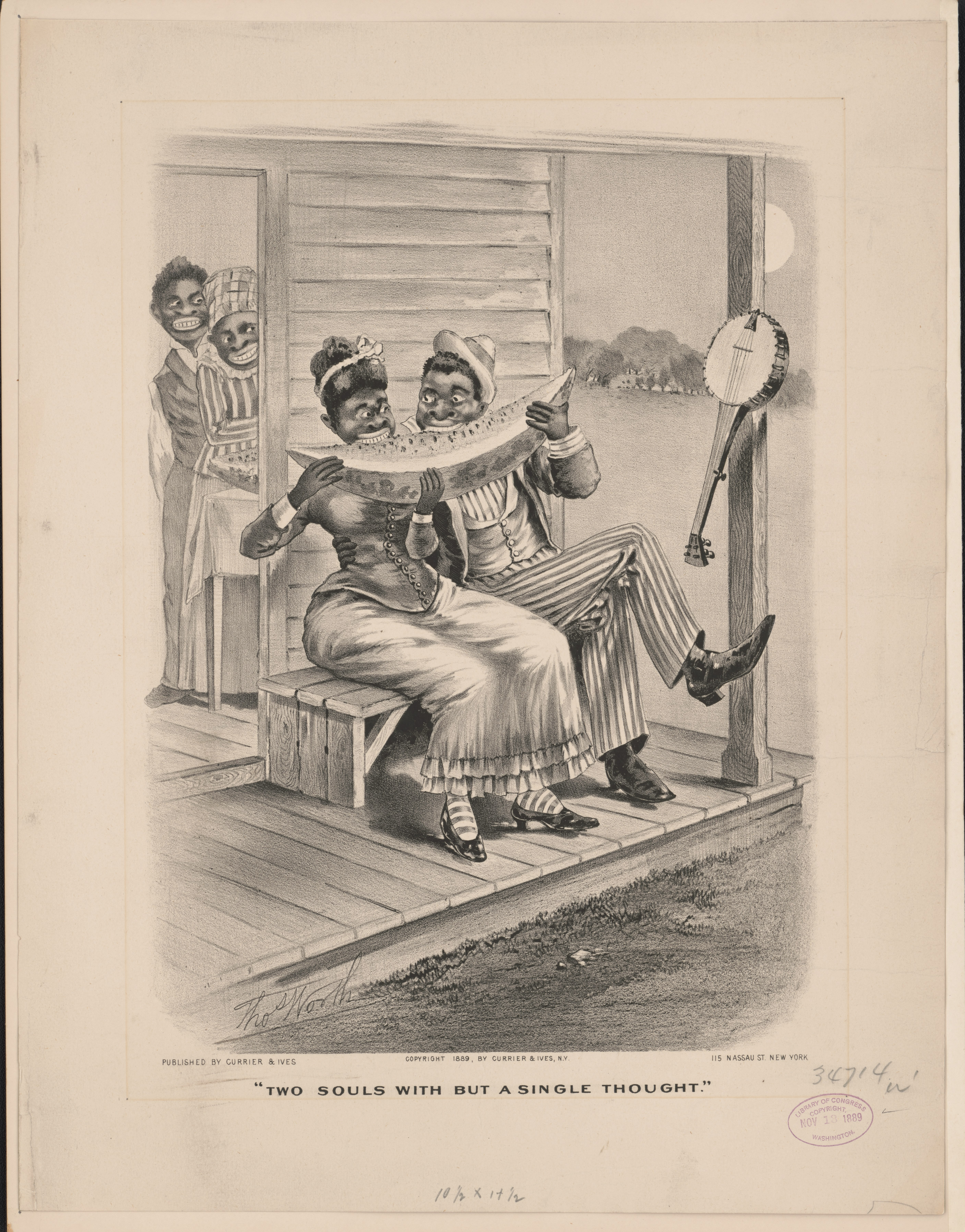
Couple sharing watermelon, banjo hangs nearby

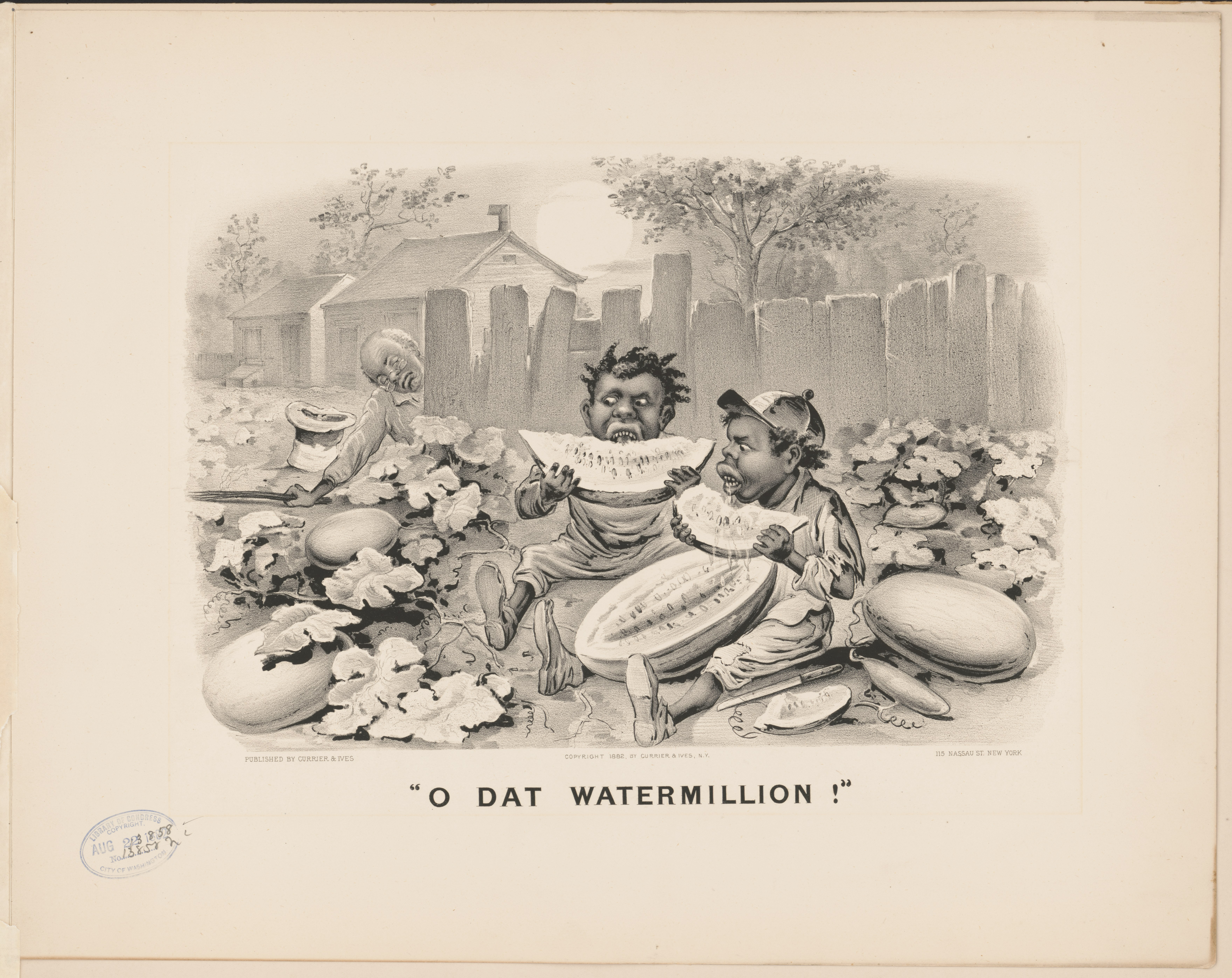

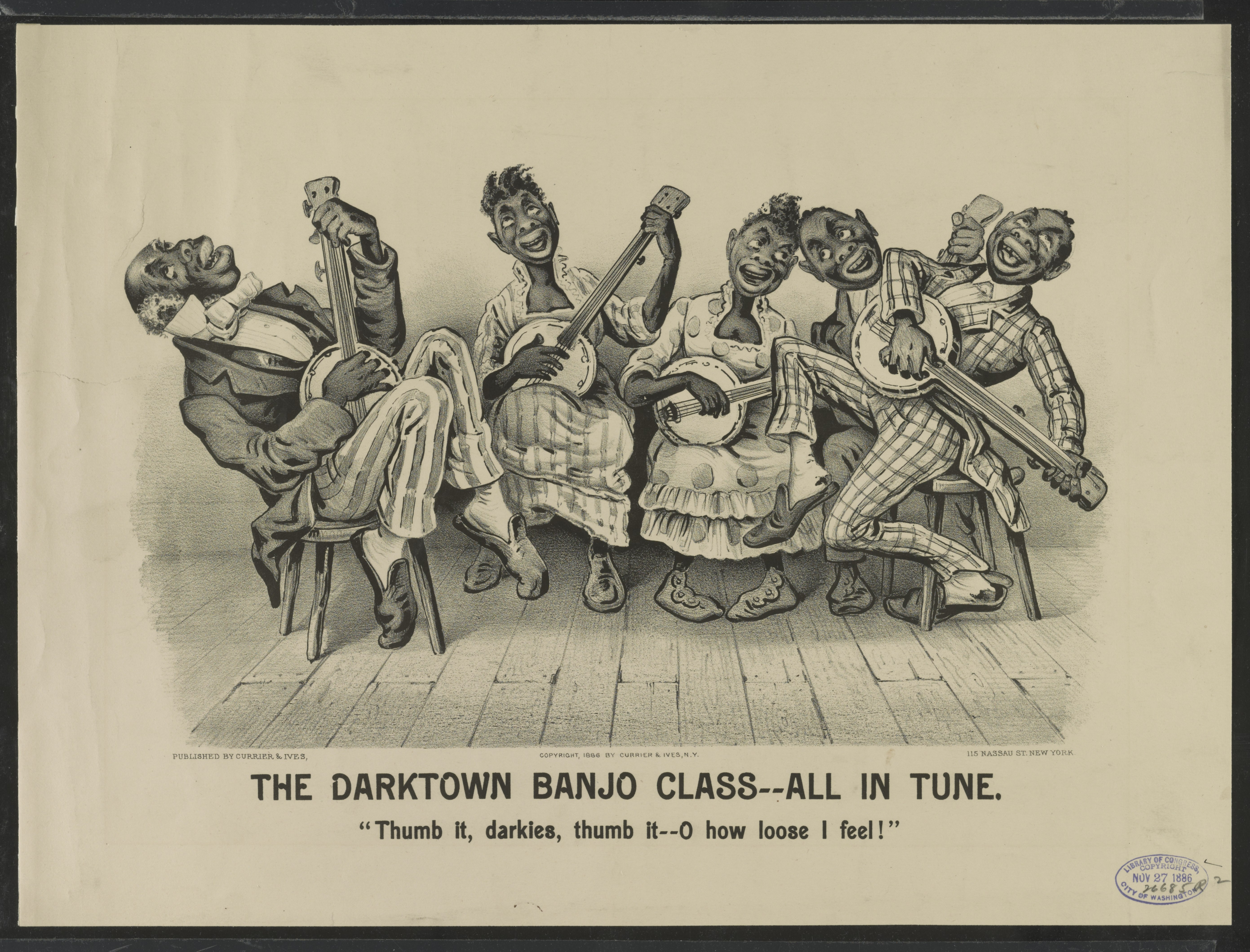
Vignette 1 of 2

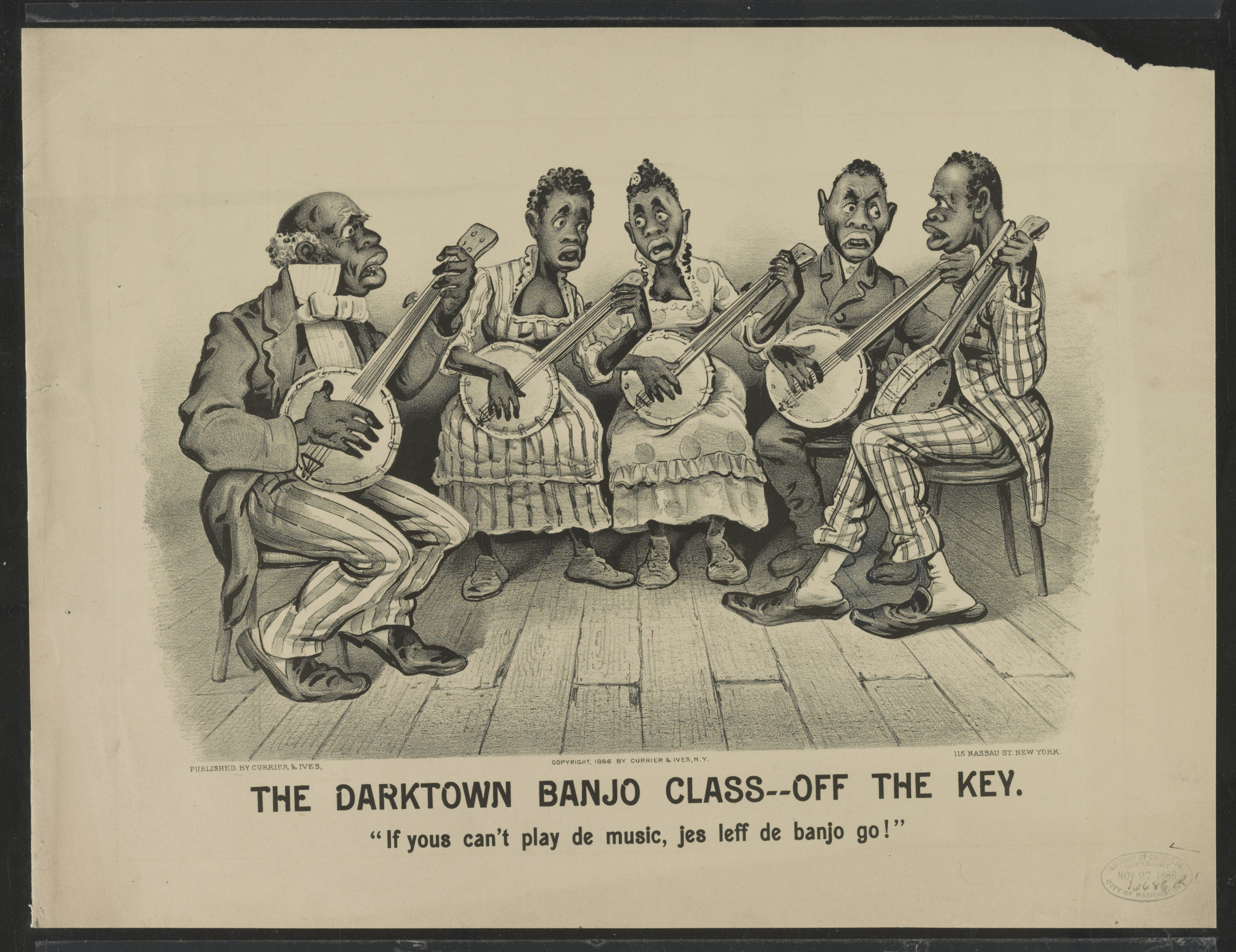
Vignette 2 of 2

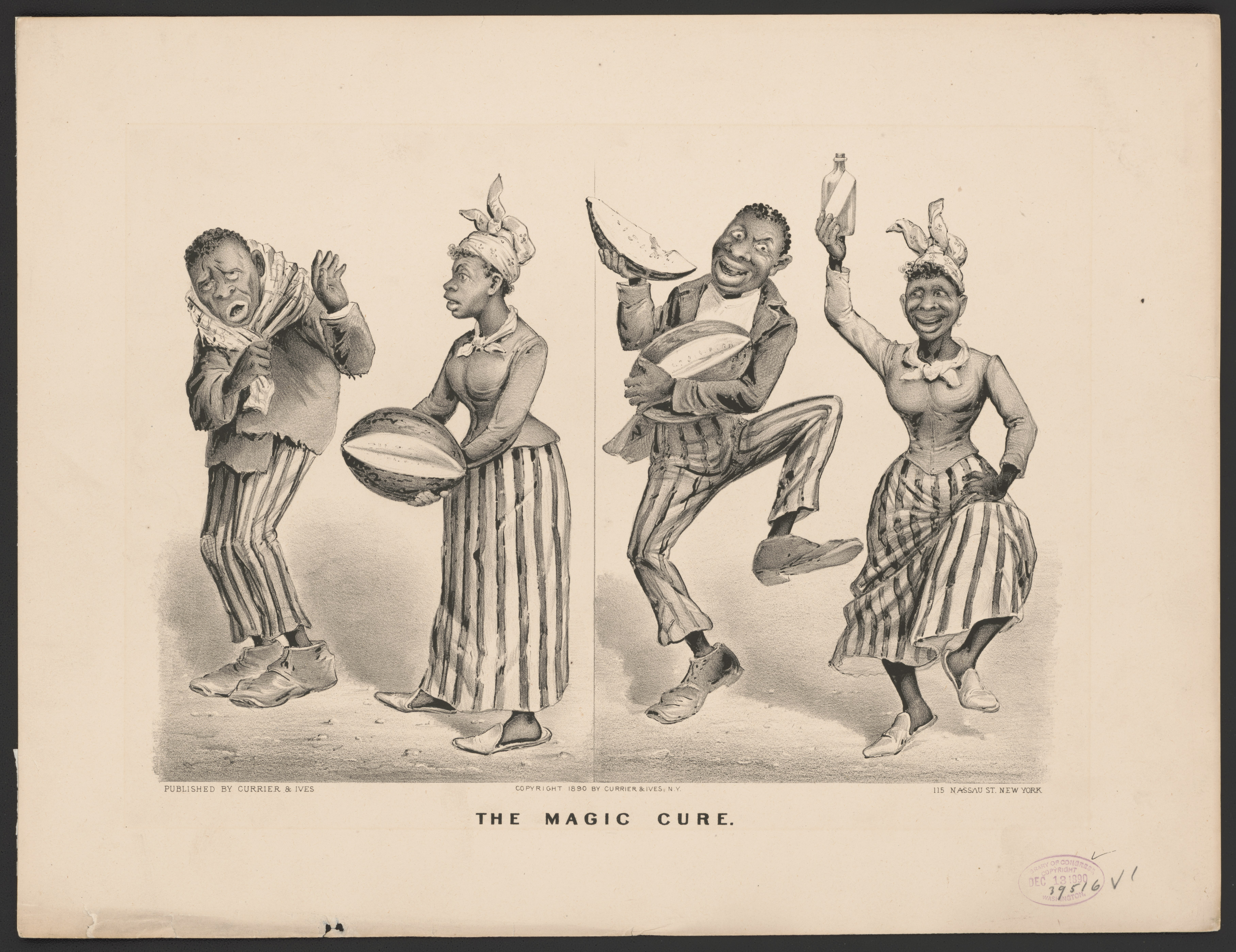
The Magic Cure

=== Children ===
Black children are generally portrayed in Darktown Comics as "mischievous and out of their parents' control, showing no respect for their elders."

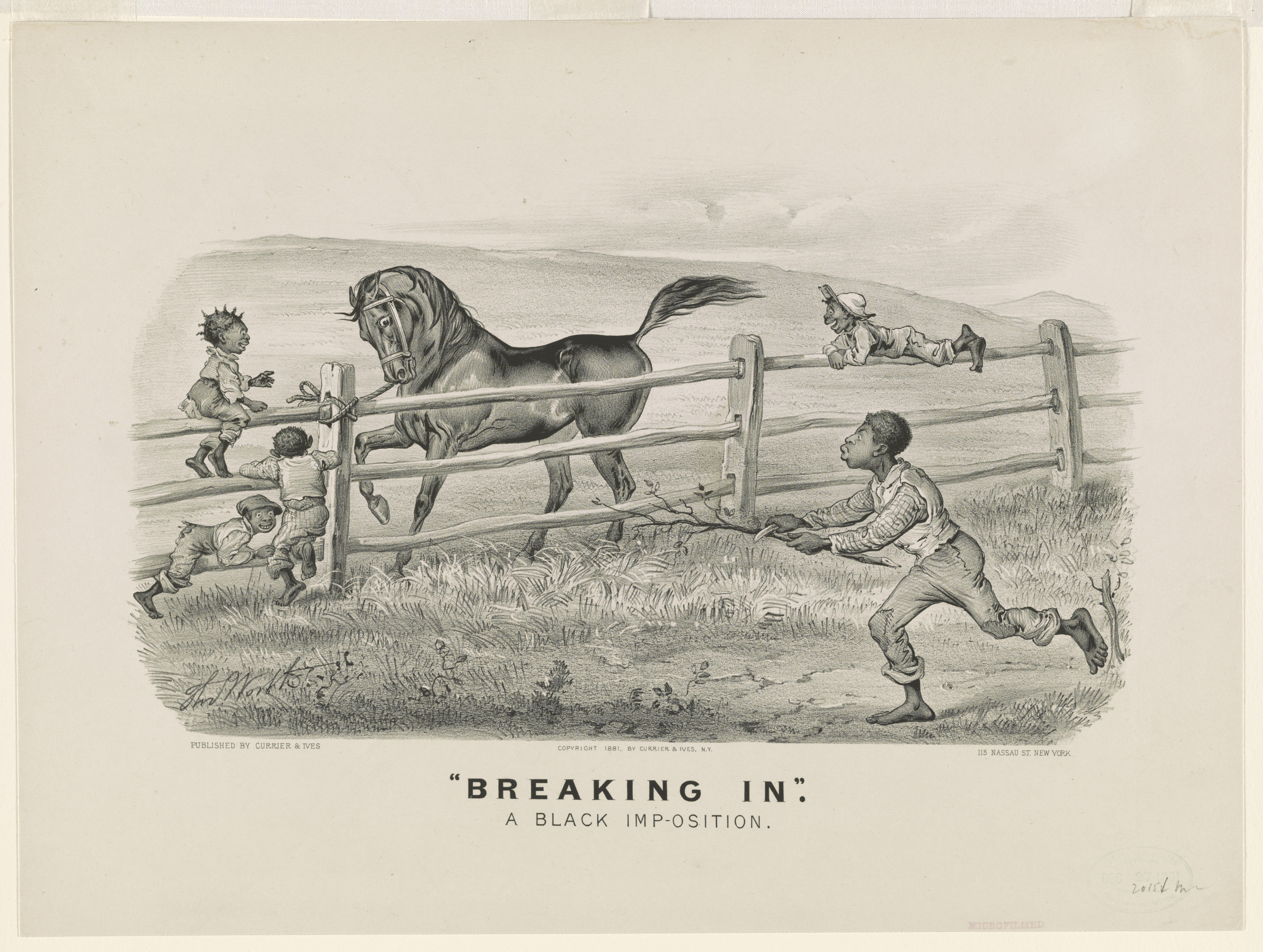
A black imp-osition

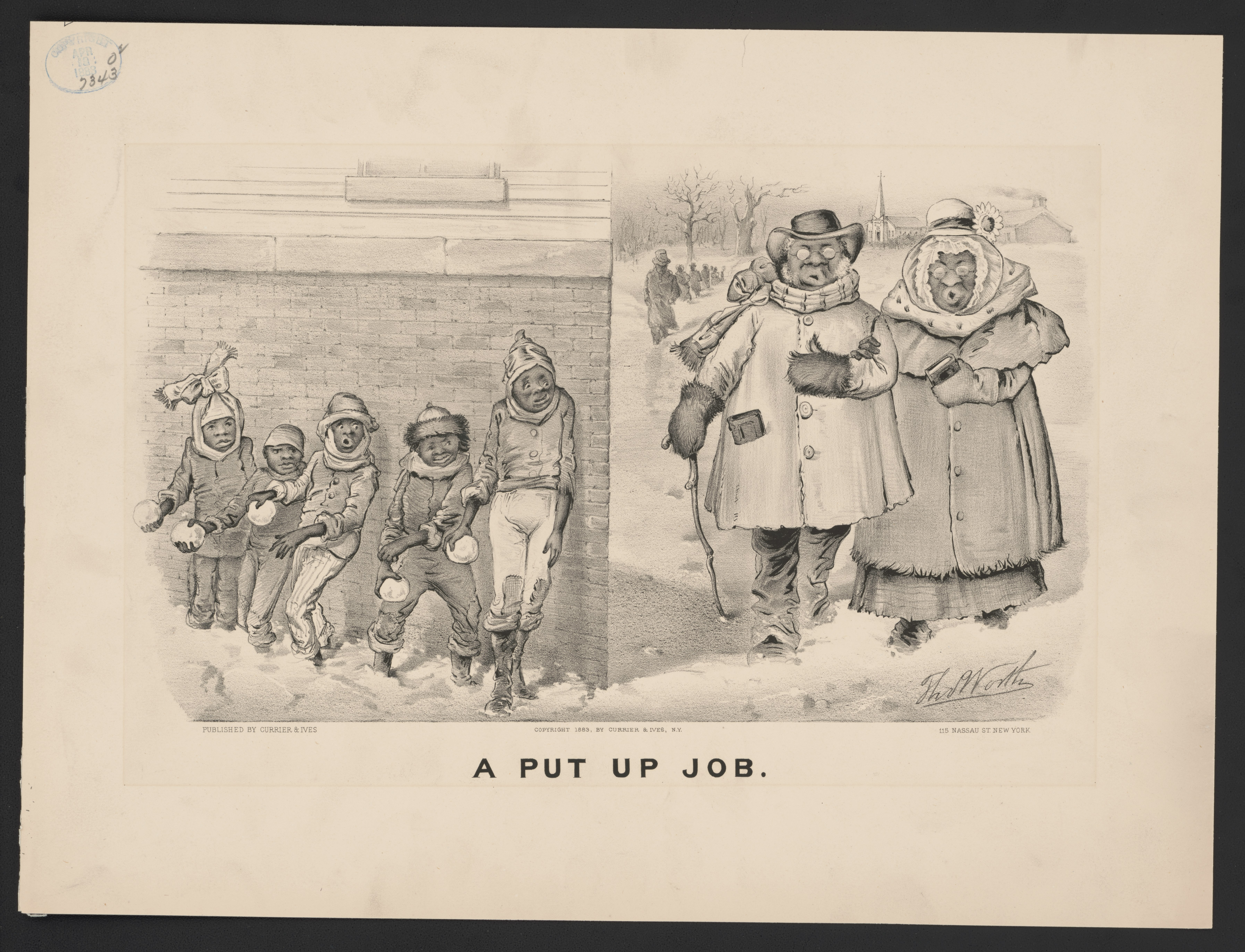

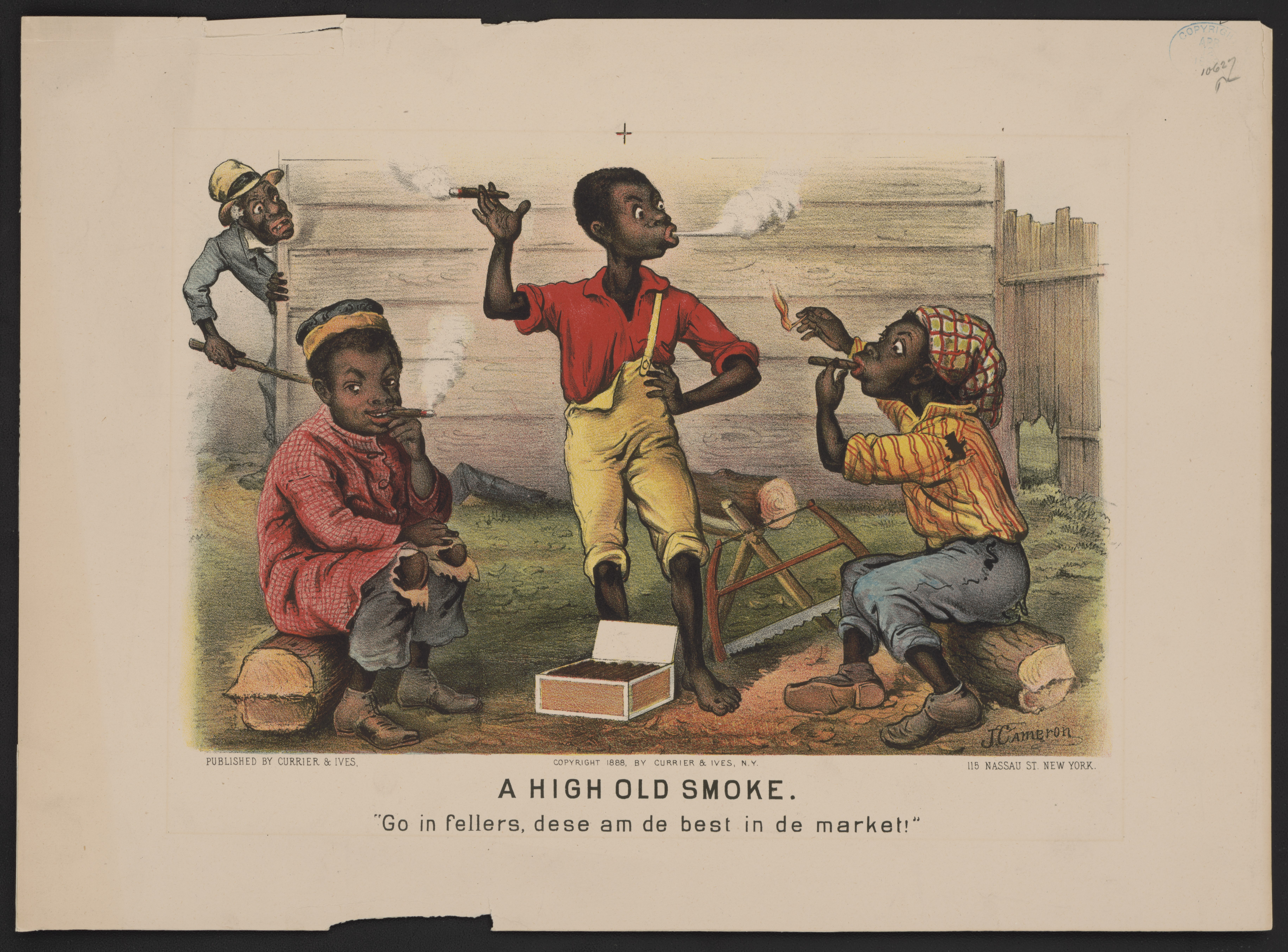

=== Blackness as dirtiness ===
The two-part "Cause and effect", noted by Le Beau as "particularly insensitive, even vicious", portrays an elderly Black man as instructing a young Black child to stay away from soap because it will "wash all de butiful brack outen you." The child ignores him and washes with the soap, leaving his hands and face bleached White, to the dismay of both.

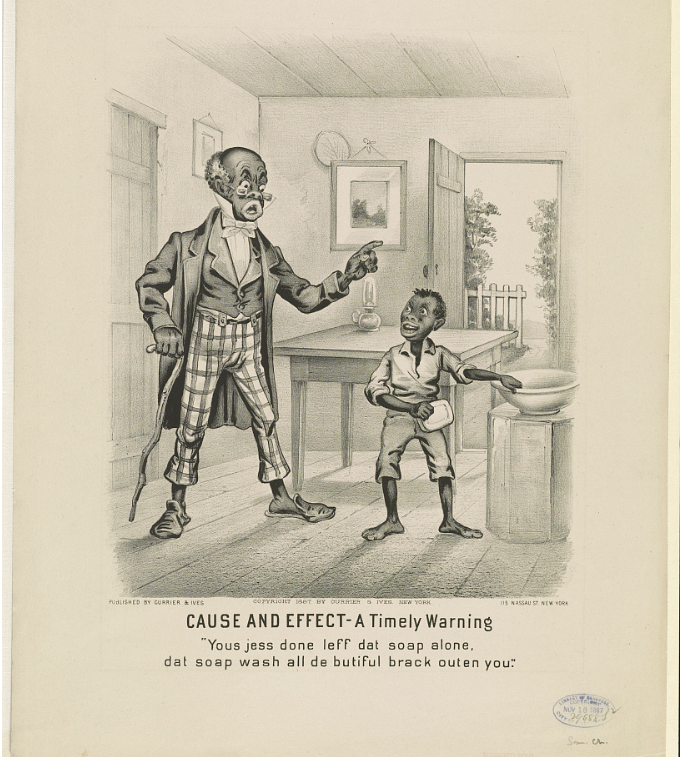

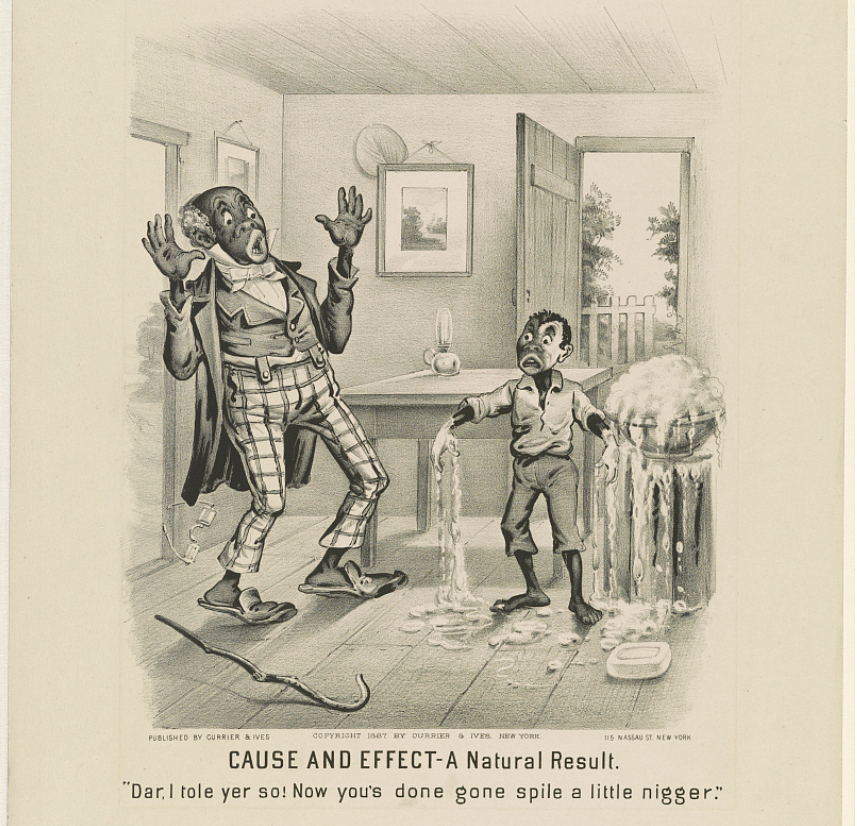

== Popularity ==
The Darktown Comics series was perennially among the bestselling of Currier & Ives' over 7000 lithographs, with at least one selling 73,000 copies via pushcarts and in shops and country stores. According to J. Michael Martinez, every one of the series was a bestseller. The Thomas Worth lithographs, including the Darktown Comics, were "as popular and profitable as any prints the firm produced." The series represented one-third of Currier & Ives' production by 1884. The Duke of Newcastle was "so delighted" by the Darktown Comics that he purchased an entire set, at the time 100 prints.

Advertising featuring Darktown Comics
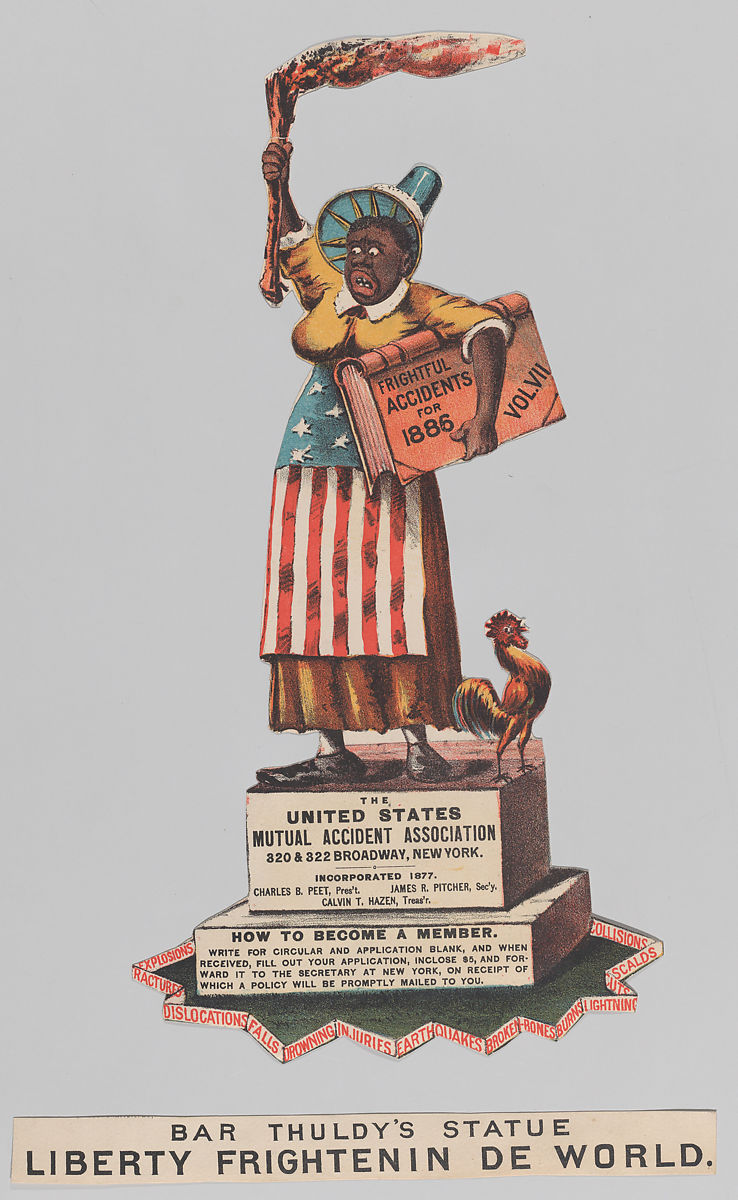
1886 cardboard cutout advertising an insurance agency

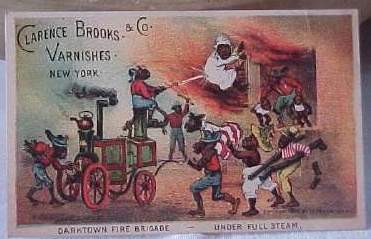
Advertisement for a varnish manufacturer

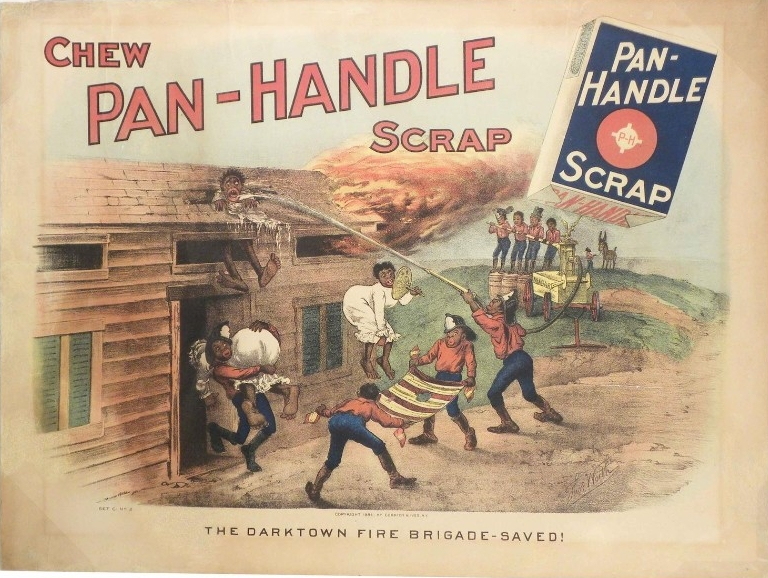
Advertisement for chewing tobacco

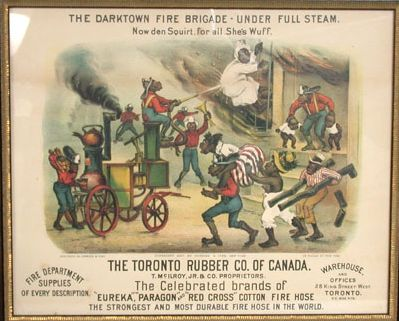
Advertisement for rubber company

== Production by others ==
In the 1880s, an English ceramics manufacturer produced two of the Darktown series, "A Mule Train on an Up Grade" and "A Mule Train on a Down Grade", on mugs.

In 1907 Currier & Ives ceased operations. The lithograph stones were "sold by the pound", according to the American Historical Print Collectors Society. Most of the lithograph stones were ground down, but the Darktown Comics were "just too lucrative" to destroy and were purchased to make restrikes by Joseph Koehler, a New York printer. Koehler reproduced the prints for several years. In London the firm of S. Lipschitz and Son created restrikes.

== Collectibility ==
As of 1996 the lithographs were among the most collectible of Currier & Ives' production.

== See also ==
- Alligator bait
- Portrayal of black people in comics
