= Thomas Mullen (author) =

American novelist (born 1974)

Thomas Mullen, U.S.
- In a 2023 interview
- Born: 1974 (age 51–52); Rhode Island, US
- Education: Oberlin College
- Occupation: Novelist
- Children: 2
- Writing career
- Language: English
- Genre: Fictional prose
- Website: www.thomasmullen.net

Thomas Mullen (born 1974) is an American novelist.

== Biography ==
Mullen was born in Rhode Island. He graduated from Portsmouth Abbey School in Portsmouth, Rhode Island, and Oberlin College in Ohio. He is married, has two children, and lives in Atlanta, Georgia.

== Bibliography ==
- 2006 The Last Town on Earth
- 2010 The Many Deaths of the Firefly Brothers
- 2011 The Revisionists (Mulholland Books US and Mulholland Books UK)
- 2015 Darktown
- 2017 Lightning Men
- 2020 Midnight Atlanta
- 2023 Blind Spots
- 2024 The Rumor Game

=== Awards ===
The Last Town on Earth received the 2007 James Fenimore Cooper Prize for historical fiction. It was recognized by USA Today as the "Best Début Novel" of the year and the Chicago Tribune as one of their "Books of the Year". In 2021, Midnight Atlanta was shortlisted in the Gold Dagger category at the Crime Writers' Association Awards, with the result to be announced in July 2021.
