= Shermantown, Georgia =

Shantytown in Georgia, United States

Coordinates: 33°48′7″N 84°10′0″W

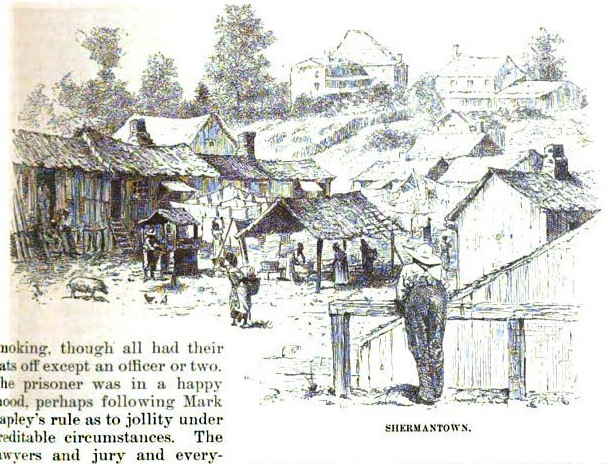
Illustration of Shermantown from Harper's New Monthly Magazine, 1880

Shermantown was a late 19th-century African-American shantytown in Stone Mountain Village neighborhood of Stone Mountain in Dekalb County, Georgia named for General Sherman, whose troops occupied Atlanta after the Civil War.
