= Richard Powers bibliography =

List of works by or about Richard Powers, American novelist.

== Novels ==
- 1985 Three Farmers on Their Way to a Dance, HarperCollins ISBN 0-688-04201-5
- 1988 Prisoner's Dilemma, McGraw Hill ISBN 0-07-050612-4
- 1991 The Gold Bug Variations, HarperCollins ISBN 0-688-09891-6
- 1993 Operation Wandering Soul, HarperCollins ISBN 0-688-11548-9
- 1995 Galatea 2.2, Farrar Straus & Giroux ISBN 0-374-19948-5
- 1998 Gain, Farrar Straus & Giroux ISBN 0-312-20409-4
- 2000 Plowing the Dark, Farrar, Straus & Giroux ISBN 0-374-23461-2
- 2003 The Time of Our Singing, Farrar, Straus & Giroux ISBN 0-374-27782-6
- 2006 The Echo Maker, Farrar, Straus & Giroux ISBN 0-374-14635-7
- 2009 Generosity: An Enhancement, Farrar, Straus & Giroux ISBN 0-374-16114-3
- 2014 Orfeo, W. W. Norton & Company ISBN 978-0-393-24082-5
- 2018 The Overstory, W. W. Norton & Company ISBN 978-0-393-63552-2
- 2021 Bewilderment, W. W. Norton & Company ISBN 978-0-393-88114-1
- 2024 Playground, W. W. Norton & Company ISBN 978-1-324-08603-1
- 2027 Late Light

== Short fiction ==
Title	Publication	Collected in
"The Best Place for It"	The New Yorker (February 1, 1988)	excerpt from Prisoner's Dilemma
"We Are Climbing Jacob's Ladder"	Grand Street 38 (Winter 1991)	excerpt from Gold Bug Variations
"Escapes"	Esquire (July 1999)	excerpts from Plowing the Dark
"From 'Plowing the Dark'"	Conjunctions 33 (Fall 1999)	excerpts from Plowing the Dark
"Singing"	Conjunctions 37 (Fall 2001)	excerpt from The Time of Our Singing
"Literary Devices"	Zoetrope: All-Story (Winter 2002)	-
"Easter, 1939"	The Paris Review 164 (Winter 2002-03)	excerpt from The Time of Our Singing
"Improvisations"	PEN America 3.5 (2004)	excerpt from Galatea 2.2
"Cranes"	Black Clock 3 (Spring 2005)	excerpt from The Echo Maker
"The Seventh Event"	Granta 90 (Summer 2005)	-
"The Moving Finger"	The Journal 31.2 (Autumn-Winter 2007)	-
"Modulation"	Conjunctions 50 (Spring 2008)	-
"Enquire Within Upon Everything"	The Paris Review 190 (Fall 2009)	-
"To the Measures Fall"	The New Yorker (October 18, 2010)	-
"Dark Was the Night"	Playboy (December 2011)	-
"Genie"	Genie (2012)	-
"Lodestar"	Monkey Business 3 (2013)	-
"Saints Hill"	Conjunctions 76 (Spring 2021)	-

== Essays ==
- "Eyes Wide Open". The New York Times Magazine. April 18, 1999.
- "Being and Seeming: The Technology of Representation". Context: A Forum for Literary Arts and Culture. No. 3. 2000. Archived from the original on 2001-03-03.
- "A Brief Take on Genetic Screening". The Believer (32). March 2006.
- "How to Speak a Book". The New York Times. January 7, 2007.
- "The Book of Me". GQ. October 2008.
- "Soaked". Granta (108): 150–152. Summer 2009.
- "1897, Memorial Day". A New Literary History of America. Cambridge, Mass: Belknap Press. 2009. pp. 434–440. ISBN 978-0674035942.
- "Out of Body, Out of Mind". The New York Times. December 26, 2009.
- "What Is Artificial Intelligence?". The New York Times. February 5, 2011.
- "What Does Fiction Know?". The Design Observer. August 2, 2011. Archived from the original on 2011-10-09.
- Powers, Richard (March–April 2014). "Children of the Revolution". American Book Review. 35 (3): 8. doi:10.1353/abr.2014.0044. S2CID 143124177.
- "Keep America Wild". The New York Times. June 16, 2017.
- Powers, Richard (2021). "One, Two, Three . . . Infinity". Ways of Hearing: Reflections on Music in 26 Pieces. Princeton: Princeton University Press. pp. 1–6. doi:10.1515/9780691225975-002. ISBN 9780691204475. S2CID 244239172.
- "A Little More Than Kin". Kinship: Belonging in a World of Relations, Vol. 3 – Partners. Center for Humans and Nature. 2021. ISBN 978-1736862520.
