= Braiding Sweetgrass =

2013 book by Robin Wall Kimmerer

- Author: Robin Wall Kimmerer
- Audio read by: Robin Wall Kimmerer
- Cover artist: Gretchen Achilles
- Language: English
- Subject: Traditional ecological knowledge, Indigenous American philosophy, Plant ecology, Botany
- Genre: Non-fiction Indigenous American philosophy Philosophy of Nature
- Set in: North America
- Publisher: Milkweed Editions
- Publication date: 2013
- Pages: 408
- Awards: 2014 Sigurd F. Olson Nature Writing Award
- ISBN: 978-1-57131-335-5 (hardback; alkaline paper)
- OCLC: 829743464
- LC Class: E98.P5K56 2013
- Preceded by: Gathering Moss: A Natural and Cultural History of Mosses
- Followed by: "Council of the Pecans" in Orion Magazine in 2013
- Website: Official site

Braiding Sweetgrass: Indigenous Wisdom, Scientific Knowledge, and the Teachings of Plants is a 2013 nonfiction book by Potawatomi professor Robin Wall Kimmerer, about the role of Indigenous knowledge as an alternative or complementary approach to Western mainstream scientific methodologies.

Braiding Sweetgrass explores reciprocal relationships between humans and the land, with a focus on the role of plants and botany in both Native American and Western European traditions. The book received largely positive reviews, and has appeared on several bestseller lists. Kimmerer is known for her scholarship on traditional ecological knowledge, ethnobotany, and moss ecology.

== Contents ==
Braiding Sweetgrass: Indigenous Wisdom, Scientific Knowledge, and the Teachings of Plants is about botany and the relationship to land in Native American traditions. Kimmerer, who is an enrolled member of the Citizen Potawatomi Nation, writes about her personal experiences working with plants and reuniting with her people's cultural traditions. She also presents the history of the plants and botany from a scientific perspective.

Kimmerer begins with the myth of Skywoman, adapted from oral tradition, that explains "where we came from, but also of how we can go forward." In the same chapter, Kimmerer explains that the significance of sweetgrass according to this myth is that it is believed to be the first plant to grow on earth. Kimmerer also relates the Haudenosaunee Thanksgiving Address. In some Native American religions, such as the Potawatomi's, certain beliefs are not meant to be shared with outsiders, so she asked Oren Lyons, a Faithkeeper who manages spiritual matters for the Onondaga Nation of the Haudenosaunee, for permission to print the address. Lyons heartily agreed.

The series of essays in five sections begins with "Planting Sweetgrass", and progresses through "Tending", "Picking", "Braiding", and "Burning Sweetgrass". James Hatley says that this progression of headings "signals how Kimmerer's book functions not only as natural history but also as ceremony, the latter of which plays a decisive role in how Kimmerer comes to know the living world."

Kimmerer describes Braiding Sweetgrass as "[A] braid of stories ... woven from three strands: indigenous ways of knowing, scientific knowledge, and the story of an Anishinabeckwe scientist trying to bring them together in service to what matters most." She also calls the work "an intertwining of science, spirit, and story."

American Indian Quarterly writes that Braiding Sweetgrass is a book about traditional ecological knowledge and environmental humanities. Kimmerer combines her training in Western scientific methods and her Native American knowledge about sustainable land stewardship to describe a more joyful and ecological way of using our land in Braiding Sweetgrass.

Kimmerer has said about the book that, "I wanted readers to understand that Indigenous knowledge and Western science are both powerful ways of knowing, and that by using them together we can imagine a more just and joyful relationship with the Earth." Plants described in the book include squash, algae, goldenrod, pecans and the eponymous sweetgrass. She describes the book as "an invitation to celebrate the gifts of the earth."

== Honors and awards ==
Kimmerer received the 2014 Sigurd F. Olson Nature Writing Award for her book Braiding Sweetgrass: Indigenous Wisdom, Scientific Knowledge, and the Teachings of Plants. The book has also received best-seller awards amongst the New York Times Bestseller, the Washington Post Bestseller, and the Los Angeles Times Bestseller lists. It was named a "Best Essay Collection of the Decade" by Literary Hub and a Book Riot "Favorite Summer Read of 2020."

== Reception ==
On February 9, 2020, the book first appeared at No. 14 on the New York Times Best Sellers paperback nonfiction list; at the beginning of November 2020, in its 30th week, it was at No. 9. In 2021, The Independent recommended the book as the top choice of books about climate change. In 2024, the book was one of the most borrowed titles in American public libraries.

Native Studies Review writes that Braiding Sweetgrass is a "book to savour and to read again and again." Heather Sullivan writes in the Journal of Germanic Studies that "one occasionally encounters a text like an earthquake: it shakes one's fundamental assumptions with a massive shift that, in comparison, renders mere epiphanies bloodless: Robin Wall Kimmerer's Braiding Sweetgrass is one of these kinds of books."

Sue O'Brien in Library Journal wrote "Kimmerer writes of investigating the natural world with her students and her efforts to protect and restore plants, animals, and land. A trained scientist who never loses sight of her Native heritage, she speaks of approaching nature with gratitude and giving back in return for what we receive." O'Brien expresses that anyone "who enjoys reading about natural history, botany, protecting nature, or Native American culture will love this book".

The Appalachian Review notes that Kimmerer's writing does not fall into "preachy, new-age, practical bring-your-own-grocery-bags environmental movement writing" nor "the flowing optimism of pure nature writing." The reader is compelled to act and change their view of the environment as the book "challenges the European immigrant ecological consciousness" through "Native American creation stories and details of sustainable, traditional, ecological management practices of Native Americans."

Kathleen D. Moore in The Bryologist says that Braiding Sweetgrass "is far more than a memoir or a field guide. I would call it a wisdom book, because I believe that Robin has something world-changing to pass along, an ethos she has learned by listening closely to plants". The Tribal College Journal wrote "Each chapter is an adventurous journey into the world of plants." Publishers Weekly call Kimmerer a "mesmerizing storyteller" in Braiding Sweetgrass. The Star Tribune writes that Kimmerer is able to give readers the ability to see the common world in a new way. Kirkus Reviews calls Braiding Sweetgrass a "smart, subtle overlay of different systems of thought that together teach us to be better citizens of Earth."

Author Richard Powers said while listening to the audiobook of Braiding Sweetgrass on a cross-country drive, "I had to pull over several times. My eyes were filled with tears, and I couldn't see the road." He also said Braiding Sweetgrass helped to shape his novel The Overstory.
