= Prisoner's dilemma (disambiguation) =

The prisoner's dilemma is a standard example in game theory.

Prisoner's dilemma may also refer to:

- Prisoner's Dilemma (novel), a 1988 novel by Richard Powers
- The Prisoner's Dilemma (audio drama), a 2009 audiobook based on Doctor Who
- The Prisoner's Dilemma (play), a 2001 play by David Edgar
- "Prisoner's Dilemma" (Person of Interest), a 2013 television episode
- "The Prisoner's Dilemma" (Prison Break), a 2017 television episode
- "The Prisoner's Dilemma" (Voltron: Legendary Defender), a 2018 television episode

== See also ==
- Innocent prisoner's dilemma, a detrimental effect of a legal system in which admission of guilt can result in a lesser punishment
