= Brian Swardstrom =

American talent agent and manager (born 1962)

- Born: 1962 (age 63–64); U.S.
- Occupations: Talent agent; talent manager
- Years active: 1991–present
- Spouse: Peter Spears

Brian Swardstrom (born 1962) is an American talent agent and manager. He is known for his long-time working relationship with Tilda Swinton, Edward Norton, Frances McDormand, Bill Paxton and Damian Lewis. Since 2023, Swardstrom works solely as Timothée Chalamet's manager, after being his agent for ten years.

He began his career working as an agent for William Morris where he worked with actors such as Alan Arkin, Elijah Wood and Brendan Fraser. He became a manager at Brillstein-Grey and later at his own companies, Banner Entertainment founded with Mikey Liddell, and InHouse Entertainment with Marc Epstein.

Swardstrom left the management business and joined Endeavor as partner and agent in 1998. He ran the talent department until 2009, when Endeavor merged with the William Morrris Agency. He moved to the United Talent Agency as a partner and agent in 2014. Swardstrom list of clients over the years have included: Patrick Stewart, Michael Douglas, Cynthia Erivo, Claire Danes, Claire Foy, John Lithgow, Matthew Macfadyen, Léa Seydoux, Daisy Edgar-Jones, Kevin Kline, Sally Field, Jamie Bell, Ben Foster, Luca Guadagnino, Rupert Wyatt, and Michael C. Hall. In 2023 he left UTA to focus on producing and retired as an agent, leaving most of his roster at the agency.

== Early life ==
Swardstrom grew up in Cape Cod, Massachusetts. His father, John Wendell Swardstrom, was from North Dakota and worked as a teacher at Massachusetts Maritime Academy. He has two brothers. Swardstrom attended Bourne High School from which he graduated in 1980.

== Career ==
Swardstrom began his career in Los Angeles in the mailroom of Triad Artists in 1987 and later worked as an assistant for producer Arnold Rifkin. After Triad's merger with William Morris, Swardstrom became a talent agent at the company. At WMA he was an agent to Alan Arkin.

In 1993, Swardstrom left agenting to become a manager at Brillstein-Grey, he brought over around six clients from WMA including Brendan Fraser and Elijah Wood. At Brillstein he signed Christian Slater. The next year, he teamed up with Mickey Liddell and they formed the management company Banner Entertainment. He acted as president of the company. Some of his work includes producing the films Traveller (1997), starring client Bill Paxton, Telling Lies in America (1997), Under Heaven (1998) and Delivered (1999). While at the company he signed Edward Norton and managed Ricki Lake and Vin Diesel. In late 1997 Swardstrom exited Banner as the company abandoned their talent division to focus on producing. After the split he formed InHouse Entertainment with fellow talent manager Marc Epstein, while at InHouse their clients included Nicole Kidman and Rupert Everett.

In 1998 Swardstrom, at the time 36, joined Endeavor as a talent agent and partner. He abandoned management after five years citing "the exciting pace of the agency world, and, specifically, that of Endeavor" as his main reason. He ran the talent department at the agency, which had just recently began representing actors, from an office in Manhattan. He brought over several of his clients from Banner including Norton, Paxton and Parker Posey. He also repped James Van Der Beek. In 2009 Endeavor merged with the William Morris Agency, and Swardstrom joined the company later known as WME as a founding partner, moving to Los Angeles with the rest of the team. He was included in an article of The Los Angeles Times listing Hollywood figures "who wield their clout with kindness".

In 2013, Swardstrom signed then upcoming actor Timothée Chalamet at the behest of client Damian Lewis. Lewis had worked with Chalamet on the second season of Homeland and encouraged Swardstrom to get in touch with him: "I think you should get on the phone right away with this kid, because I think very soon, everyone's going to be on the phone with him." Lewis told him. After meeting with Chalamet at his office, he introduced the actor to his husband Peter Spears, who at the time was working as a producer in Luca Guadagnino's Call Me by Your Name, as he believed he was a good fit to play the lead role. Chalamet's portrayal in the film earned him a nomination for the Academy Award for Best Actor, becoming the third-youngest nominee in the category at 22 years old. Swardstrom left WME in late 2013 after failing to reach a new deal with the company. At the time he represented, among other actors: Paxton, Claire Danes, Ben Foster, Diane Lane, Frances McDormand, Jessica Lange, John Lithgow, Michael C. Hall, Michael Chiklis, Ray Stevenson and Tracey Ullman. He also counted with filmmakers on his roster such as Sam Taylor-Johnson, Luca Guadagnino, Ira Sachs and Oren Moverman.

In early 2014 Swardstrom joined the United Talent Agency, returning to New York as a partner and talent agent. Most of his previous clients followed him including: Patrick Stewart, Jamie Bell, Aaron Taylor-Johnson, Emile Hirsch, Damian Lewis, Edward Norton, Timothée Chalamet, Agyness Deyn, Julia Garner, Bill Heck, Jonathan Pryce, Ben Rosenfield, Scott Speedman and Tilda Swinton. Michael Douglas also joined him at the agency. Swardstrom decided to leave UTA in 2023, after nine years, he retired as an agent leaving most of his clients at the company to focus on producing with husband Peter Spears. Since then, Swardstrom only retained Chalamet as a client, working full time as his manager. He is attached, alongside Chalamet, to produce a film adaptation of Richard Powers' 2024 book Playground.

== Personal life ==
Swardstrom is married to film producer Peter Spears and the couple lives in California. They previously owned William Henry Ludlow House, which they bought in 2009.

== Filmography ==
Year	Title	Role	Notes
1997	Traveller	Producer	—N/a
1997	Telling Lies in America	Producer	—N/a
1998	Under Heaven	Producer	—N/a
1998	Cosmo's Tale	Executive producer	Short film
1999	Delivered	Producer	—N/a
