= Society of American Historians Prize for Historical Fiction =

- Awarded for: Best in Historical fiction
- Presented by: Society of American Historians
- First award: 1993
- Website: sah.columbia.edu

The Society of American Historians Prize for Historical Fiction, formerly known as the James Fenimore Cooper Prize, is a biennial award given for the best Historical American fiction by the Society of American Historians. It is awarded in the odd-numbered years.

== History ==
The prize has been awarded since 1993. It is given to honor a work of literary fiction that "makes a significant contribution to historical understanding, portrays authentically the people and events of the historical past, and displays skills in narrative construction and prose style" and that concerns American history. The prize, which until 2018 was named for nineteenth-century American historical novelist James Fenimore Cooper, carries a cash award of US$2,000.

== Awards ==
- 1993: Shaman by Noah Gordon
- 1995: In the Lake of the Woods by Tim O'Brien
- 1997: The Cattle Killing by John Edgar Wideman
- 1999: Gain by Richard Powers
- 2001: Tie: A Dangerous Friend by Ward Just and Bone by Bone by Peter Matthiessen
- 2003: Paradise Alley by Kevin Baker
- 2005: The Plot Against America by Philip Roth
- 2007: The Last Town on Earth by Thomas Mullen
- 2009: Loving Frank by Nancy Horan
- 2011: Matterhorn: A Novel of the Vietnam War by Karl Marlantes
- 2013: Remember Ben Clayton by Stephen Harrigan
- 2015: Saint Monkey by Jacinda Townsend
- 2017: No prize awarded
- 2019: There There by Tommy Orange
- 2021: Conjure Women by Afia Atakora
- 2023: A Dangerous Business by Jane Smiley
