= Young Farmers =

Young Farmers may refer to:

- National Federation of Young Farmers' Clubs, a rural youth organisation in the United Kingdom
- New Zealand Young Farmers, a rural youth organisation in New Zealand
- Young Farmers (Switzerland), a defunct political party in Switzerland
- Young Farmers' Clubs of Ulster, a rural youth organisation in Northern Ireland
- Young Farmers (photograph), a photograph taken by August Sander in 1914
