= Bewilderment =

2021 novel by Richard Powers

- First edition cover
- Author: Richard Powers
- Audio read by: Edoardo Ballerini
- Language: English
- Publisher: W. W. Norton & Company
- Publication date: September 21, 2021
- Publication place: United States
- Media type: Print (hardcover)
- Pages: 288
- ISBN: 978-0-393-88114-1
- OCLC: 1240265353
- Dewey Decimal: 813/.54
- LC Class: PS3566.O92 B49 2021
- Preceded by: The Overstory
- Followed by: Playground

Bewilderment is a 2021 novel by Richard Powers, published on September 21, 2021, by W. W. Norton & Company. It is Powers' thirteenth novel, his first since winning the 2019 Pulitzer Prize for Fiction for his novel The Overstory (2018).

The novel was shortlisted for the 2021 Booker Prize.

== Summary ==
The novel is set in the near future amid the environmental degradation of the planet. It follows widowed astrobiologist Theo Byrne and his volatile nine-year-old son Robin, who is diagnosed with Asperger syndrome, obsessive–compulsive disorder and attention deficit hyperactivity disorder. Theo resists psychoactive medication for Robin, turning instead to an experimental neurofeedback therapy in order to help his son. In an interview for the Booker Prize, Powers said, "The book has its roots in two different worlds. It is, in part, a novel about the anxiety of family life on a damaged planet, and for that, I'm indebted to writers as varied as Margaret Atwood, Barbara Kingsolver, Evan Dara, Don Delillo, and Lauren Groff."

Powers has said that he named the character of Robin after Robin Wall Kimmerer.

== Reception ==
=== Reviews ===
Kirkus Reviews, in its starred review, called Bewilderment a "touching novel that offers a vital message with uncommon sympathy and intelligence." Dwight Garner of The New York Times characterized it as a book about "ecological salvation" with a "nubbly sentimentality" but said it "is so meek, saccharine and overweening in its piety about nature that even a teaspoon of it numbs the mind." A more positive review by The Guardian called it a "tender sci-fi novel-cum-family romance."

Publishers Weekly compared the novel to Flowers for Algernon and wrote, "The planetary descriptions grow a bit repetitive and don't gain narrative traction, but in the end, Powers transforms the wrenching story into something sublime. Though it's not his masterpiece, it shows the work of a master." Writing for Harper's Magazine, novelist Claire Messud felt the novel's plot and themes were too familiar to Powers' earlier works, and criticized the characterization. Messud writes,

Though central to the narrative, Alyssa is a cipher whose flatness is rendered plausible only by Theo's limited point of view. Moreover, the sketch of Theo's personal and family history feels as thin as paper. But if Theo's other relationships remain one-dimensional, the connection between father and son has greater density and texture, as does Robin's urgent and unbridled passion for the natural world.

=== Awards and honours ===
The novel was shortlisted for the 2021 Booker Prize, and longlisted for the 2021 National Book Award for Fiction and Aspen Words Literary Prize. It was selected by Oprah Winfrey as part of Oprah's Book Club on September 28, 2021.

== Film adaptation ==
In January 2021, Variety reported that Black Bear Pictures and Plan B Entertainment acquired the feature film rights to Bewilderment after a competitive bidding process.
