= Nancy Horan =

American author of historical fiction

- Occupation: Author
- Writing career
- Genre: Historical fiction
- Notable awards: James Fenimore Cooper Prize (2009)

Nancy Horan is an American author of historical fiction. Her works include Loving Frank, a novel about Mamah Borthwick and her relationship with American architect Frank Lloyd Wright, and Under the Wide and Starry Sky, a novel about the relationship between Robert Louis Stevenson and his wife. Horan was awarded the 2009 James Fenimore Cooper Prize for Best Historical Fiction by the Society of American Historians for Loving Frank.

A former resident of Oak Park, Illinois, Horan was a middle school English teacher, a freelance journalist, and worked briefly in a public relations firm before moving to an island in Puget Sound, where she lives with her husband.
