= Proverb (Reich) =

1995 composition by Steve Reich

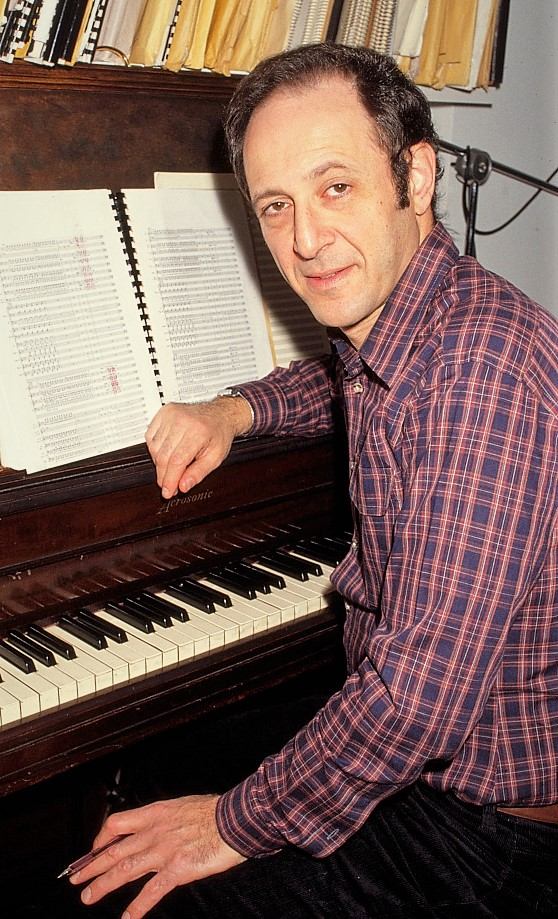
Steve Reich ca. 1982–84

Proverb is a musical composition by Steve Reich for three sopranos, two tenors, two vibraphones, and two electric organs. It sets a text by Ludwig Wittgenstein from the year 1946 and published in Culture and Value. It was written in 1995 and was originally intended for The Proms and the Utrecht Early Music Festival. It was premiered at Alice Tully Hall in New York City on February 10, 1996 by Theatre of Voices with Paul Hillier, to whom the piece is dedicated.

Proverb was written during a period when Reich was experimenting with "speech melody", and is influenced by the period Reich spent working on The Cave with Paul Hillier and singers with a strong background in medieval polyphony. This is especially apparent in the two tenor parts, which pay homage to Pérotin and organum in their use of rhythmic modes and pedal points. The text is: "How small a thought it takes to fill a whole life!" This text can be seen as explanation of the piece itself, as well as perhaps Reich's career, much of it spent exploring minimalism.

The melody is first presented by a solo soprano voice, singing a long lyric line. This original melody and text are repeated throughout the piece in successive unison canons, gradually augmenting in length but not strictly, and interspersed with tenor duets that vocalise on the prevailing vowel sound. The piece is primarily in harmonic B minor, with a central section in E flat minor. In this central part, the melody is inverted with some resulting conflict between natural and flattened leading notes, and the canon is interrupted by both a false start and a tenor interlude. The return to the home key area marks the start of the final canon, and a joining of both soprano and tenor ideas, until at the end the text is restated to a transformed melody with chordal accompaniment.

From the start Reich uses a mixture of time signatures that vary almost continuously between lengths of 4 to 9 quavers. Groupings of bar lengths begin to emerge and then changes in this underlying fabric serve to define sections, such as the tenor organa and the false canon. The work is approximately 14 minutes long.

Proverb is one of a number of Reich's works which has been remixed by electronic musicians. It is also the inspiration for a dance which was premiered at London's Barbican Centre in September 2006. It plays an important role in Richard Powers's 2014 novel Orfeo. Anna Clyne arranged the piece for full orchestra, which premiered in 2026, to celebrate Reich’s 90th birthday.

The work has been well received by critics. It has been remixed, notably, by Nobukazu Takemura on the Reich Remixed album.

== Recordings ==
- "Proverb/Nagoya Marimbas/City Life" with Paul Hillier, Theatre of Voices, Bradley Lubman, Jay Elfenbein, Jeanne LeBlanc, on Nonesuch Records, October 15, 1996.
- "Steve Reich 1965-1995 [Box Set]" on Nonesuch Records, June 3, 1997.
- The score of Proverb is available for rental from Boosey & Hawkes.
- YouTube: Steve Reich - Proverb.
