= Generosity: An Enhancement =

2009 novel by Richard Powers

- Cover of the first edition hardback
- Author: Richard Powers
- Language: English
- Publisher: Farrar, Straus and Giroux
- Publication date: 2009
- Publication place: United States
- Media type: Print (hardback)
- Pages: 296
- ISBN: 978-0-374-16114-9

Generosity: An Enhancement is the tenth novel by American author Richard Powers. Like other Powers novels it is idea-driven, strongly focusing on social alienation and scientific progress. The novel employs metafiction, including real-time intrusions by the narrator who explicitly sets the novel in a "parallel" Chicago.

Generosity tells the story of Thassadit "Thassa" Amzwar, an Algerian refugee who seemingly has overwhelming happiness ("hyperthymia") written in her genes, and the confounding effects she has on those around her, both sincere and exploitive.

== Plot summary ==
Thassa is taking a class in creative non-fiction writing taught by Russell Stone. Her boundless happiness leads the class to dub her "Miss Generosity", but puzzles and disturbs Stone, who discusses Thassa with a college counselor, Candace Weld.

A classmate tries to rape Thassa one evening, she cheerfully talks him out of it, and he turns himself in for attempted rape. Police questioning leads to news of Thassa's "condition" becoming known, and her story becomes an Internet hit. A media circus and a scientific frenzy, led by geneticist Thomas Kurton, converge on her. Stone and Weld become lovers.

Thassa agrees to be studied by Kurton and makes an appearance on "Oona" (a fictionalized Oprah). She then disappears, having returned home.

== Major characters ==
Russell Stone is a minor magazine editor, moonlighting as a writing instructor at the (fictional) Mesquakie College of Art. He suffers from writer's block. He is described by at least one character as "hapless".

Thassadit "Thassa" Amzwar is a student in his class who is perpetually upbeat despite growing up through the horrors of the Algerian Civil War. Her pseudonym in Kurton's study is "Jen", which is what she is known as on the Internet.

Thomas Kurton is the charismatic entrepreneur behind Truecyte, a genetics lab. He thinks he can find a "happiness" gene.

Candace Weld is a school psychologist. She is skeptical regarding a "happiness" gene.

Tonia Schiff is the host of a popular science show called Over The Limit.

== Reception ==
The Denver Post called it Powers's most accessible work to date. Michael Durda in The New York Review of Books cites Powers alongside Dostoevsky and Dickens in his review. The Telegraph, while generally favorable, criticized the novel's postmodernism, saying "the novel's cleverest trick is also what sucks its heart out."

As it turns out, his new novel, "Generosity," is an excellent introduction to Powers's work, a lighter, leaner treatment of his favorite themes and techniques.

— Jay McInerney, The New York Times

== See also ==
- Isaiah Eleven (2008) novel set in Chicago
