= Kyle Powys Whyte =

American philosopher, organizer and professor of environment and sustainability

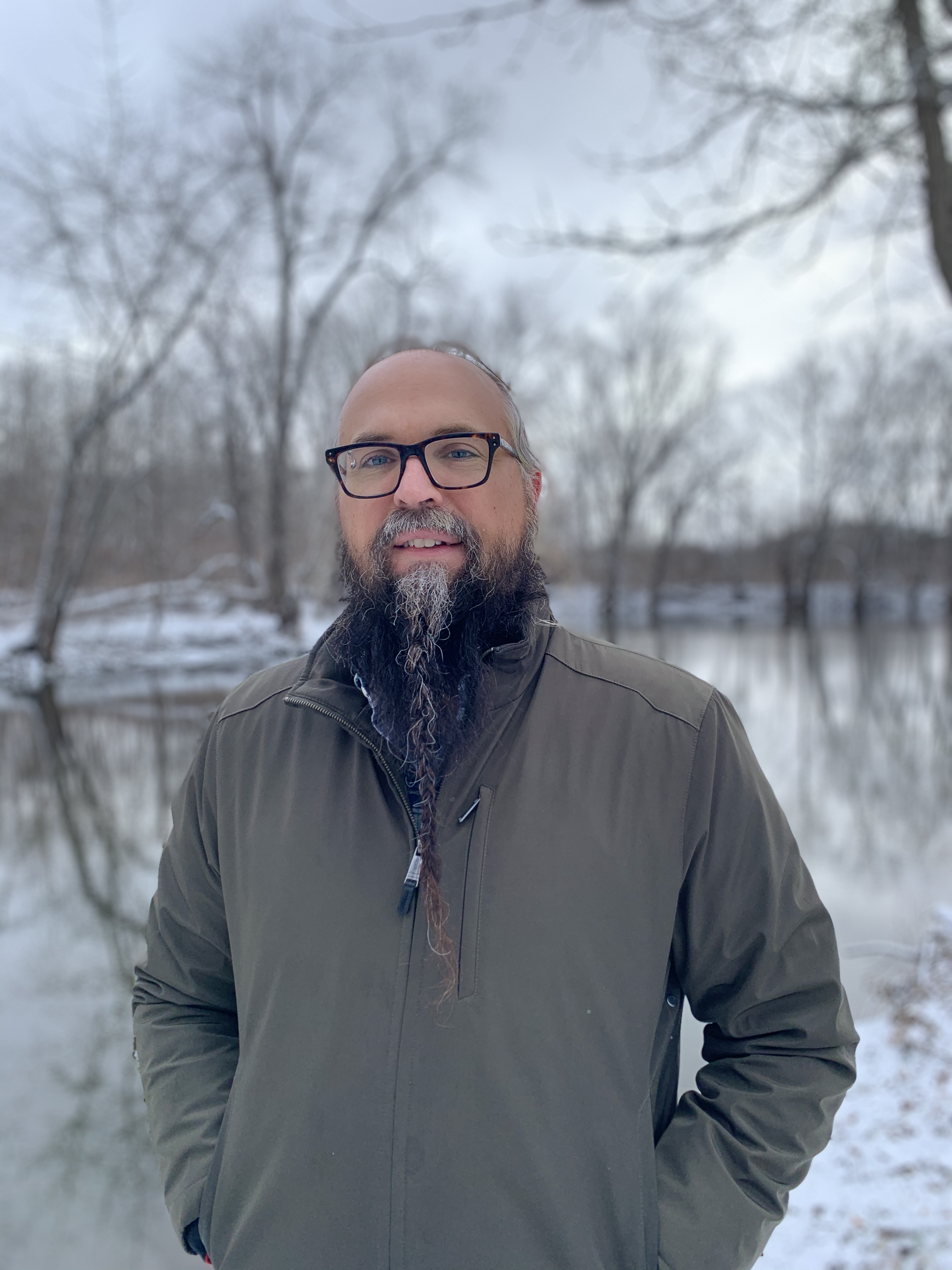

Academic background
- Education: BA, business administration, Babson College; MA, University of Memphis; PhD, 2009, Stony Brook University

Academic work
- Institutions: University of Michigan; Michigan State University

Kyle Powys Whyte is an Indigenous philosopher and climate/environmental justice scholar. He is a professor of Environment and Sustainability and George Willis Pack Professor at the University of Michigan's School for Environment and Sustainability. Whyte formerly served as the Timnick Chair in the Humanities in the Department of Philosophy at Michigan State University's College of Arts & Letters.

== Early life and education ==
Whyte is Potawatomi and an enrolled member of the Citizen Potawatomi Nation. After graduating with his undergraduate degree in business administration from Babson College, Whyte became more involved in the humanities and justice. He then earned his Master's degree from the University of Memphis and PhD from Stony Brook University. While earning his PhD, Whyte was a recipient of one of the 2009 K. Patricia Cross Future Leaders Awards.

== Career ==
Upon graduating with his PhD in 2009, Whyte accepted a faculty position at Michigan State University (MSU) and began working with Chris Caldwell at the College of Menominee Nation's Sustainable Development Institute. As an associate professor of Philosophy and Community Sustainability at MSU, he encouraged collaborative work between politicians, climate scientists, environmentalists, and Indigenous peoples to address global warming. As part of his efforts, Whyte also helped author the fourth National Climate Assessment, worked with the US Global Change Research Program, and served on various environmental boards including the National Indian Youth Council, the Pesticide Action Network, and the U.S. Federal Advisory Committee on Climate Change and Natural Resource Science. In recognition of his "collaborative work with individuals and organizations across Michigan as they work to address the impacts of global warming on the continued existence of cultures, societies, and ways of life," Whyte received the 2015 Bunyan Bryant Award.

In January 2015, Whyte was appointed the inaugural Timnick Chair in the Humanities in the College of Arts and Letters at Michigan State University. While serving in this role, he collaborated with researchers from MSU's College of Natural Science and Wisconsin's College of Menominee Nation Sustainable Development Institute to "foster better relations between tribes and scientific organizations when dealing with climate change." He later received an award from the National Science Foundation’s NSF INCLUDES program for his project "Integrating Indigenous and Western Knowledge to Transform Learning and Discovery in the Geosciences."

During the 2019–20 academic year, his final year at MSU, Whyte was promoted to the rank of Full professor. Later, Whyte and Caldwell were co-recipients of MSU's Community Engagement Scholarship Award for their work together. He also earned the Distinguished Partnership Award for Community-Engaged Research. Whyte left MSU in 2020 to accept the George Willis Pack Professorship at the University of Michigan's School for Environment & Sustainability. Whyte is also an affiliate of the Science, Technology, and Public Policy (STPP) program through the Gerald R. Ford School of Public Policy.

In 2021, Whyte was appointed to the White House Environmental Justice Advisory Council, serving a three-year term beginning March 26, 2021. In 2022, he was selected by the U.S. Department of State as one of seven U.S. Science Envoys. He has also served as the founding Faculty Director of the Tishman Center for Social Justice and the Environment at the University of Michigan since 2021.
