= Playground (novel) =

2024 novel by Richard Powers

- First edition cover
- Author: Richard Powers
- Language: English
- Publisher: W. W. Norton & Company
- Publication date: September 24, 2024
- Publication place: United States
- Media type: Print (hardcover)
- Pages: 400
- ISBN: 978-1-324-08603-1
- Preceded by: Bewilderment

Playground is a 2024 novel by Richard Powers, published on September 24, 2024, by W. W. Norton & Company. It received mostly positive reviews from critics. It was longlisted for the 2024 Booker Prize.

== Plot ==
In a first-person narration, Todd Keane, a tech billionaire suffering from dementia with Lewy bodies, recalls his childhood growing up in Evanston, Illinois; high school at the elite private school St. Ignatius College Prep in Chicago; his college years at the University of Illinois; and the building of the fictional tech giant Playground, a gamified social media site with similarities to Reddit and Facebook.

Alternating chapters contain a third-person narration describing the lives of three people who had major influences on Todd.

- Evie Beaulieu, loosely based on Dr. Sylvia Earle, is a French-Canadian marine biologist and diver who faces sexism in academia and the media but becomes a successful figure in popular science and nature advocacy. She publishes a children’s book about ocean life which was formative for a young Todd.
- Rafi Young, a brilliant young student from a poor, majority-Black neighborhood Chicago's West Side, attends St. Ignatius with Todd, where they become rivals and friends, joined by their love of games, first chess and then Go. They live together in college, Todd studying computer science and Rafi literature. Rafi provides an essential element to Playground, namely that it must be gamified.
- Ina Aroita, a sculptor who grew up on naval bases through the South Pacific, hadn’t set foot on any continent until she attended University in Illinois. She dates Rafi and becomes close to Todd as well. When she turns to Todd for advice after a fight with Rafi, Rafi takes offense and the three become estranged.

After Playground’s success, Rafi writes to Todd demanding a payout for his contribution. Todd settles out of court.

Rafi and Ina now live on Makatea with two adopted children. Beaulieu, now in her nineties, is visiting to document the local reef. The island is in the middle of a referendum on whether to open up for development to a consortium of Californian tech companies that is interested in using it as a base from which to manufacture and launch artificial islands.

When Rafi learns that Todd is an investor, he fears the move is part of a scheme to take revenge for the money Rafi got from him. He urges the islanders to vote against it. Makatea agrees to the consortium’s request by a single vote.

Todd reveals that the sections of the novel he narrates are spoken to Playground’s latest model of generative AI, Profunda. The third-person sections are a story it has invented for him based on his own memories and the public lives of himself, his friends and the real Evie Beaulieu. Evie in fact died in her seventies. Rafi died recently of a heart attack, leaving all his money to Ina. Todd admires Profunda’s story and asks the AI to finish it.

In the end of Profunda's story, Todd arrives on the island in an AI-piloted yacht. Ina and Rafi understand how ill their former friend has gotten, and they realize that he is not out for revenge. When he dies, he leaves his entire fortune to Ina. She pays for the benefits of development that the islanders hoped for, resulting in an immediate overturning of the referendum results. She and Evie discuss how to spend the rest of the fortune to protect the oceans. Todd is buried at sea with one of Ina’s sculptures.

== Film adaptation ==
In March 2026, Warner Bros. Pictures acquired the rights to adapt the book into a film. Plan B Entertainment is producing alongside Brian Swardstrom and Timothée Chalamet, the latter of whom is being courted for the lead.
