= Three Farmers on Their Way to a Dance =

1985 novel by Richard Powers

First edition (publ. William Morrow)

Three Farmers on Their Way to a Dance is Richard Powers' first novel, published in 1985. The novel follows the journeys of three young European boys represented in a c. 1913 or 1914 photograph by August Sander.

== Plot ==
Two parallel narratives – one in the voice suspected to be the author, whose surname, we learn, starts with P – offer contemporary perspectives and illustrate the interconnectedness of events. These voices provide contemporary perspectives on technology, the major theme of the novel. A series of rather academic essays on the nature of photography, including quotes from Walter Benjamin and Hannah Arendt – in the authorial narrative voice of Mr P – are interspersed with the story.

The story begins with the authorial narrative voice of Mr P. first sighting the photograph taken in the months before the outbreak of World War I of three young boys in Germany, a photograph which is titled Three Farmers on their Way to a Dance and is being exhibited at the Detroit Institute of Arts. The novel follows the fictional fates of these three young men in war time, as well as the stories of Peter Mays, a technical editor for a 1980s electronics magazine, and Mr P. – the first-person narrator of sections of the novel – who is obsessed with the photograph and with concepts of photography and technology.

Powers's later novel Galatea 2.2, published in 1995, uses the first person perspective of semifictional narrator Richard Powers to describe to a large extent the conditions under which Powers wrote Three Farmers on Their Way to a Dance.

Three Farmers on Their Way to a Dance attempts to balance the technological advancements that caused the large scale deaths in World War I with those that created art for the masses in the form of photography.
