= Peter Spears =

American actor and filmmaker (born 1965)

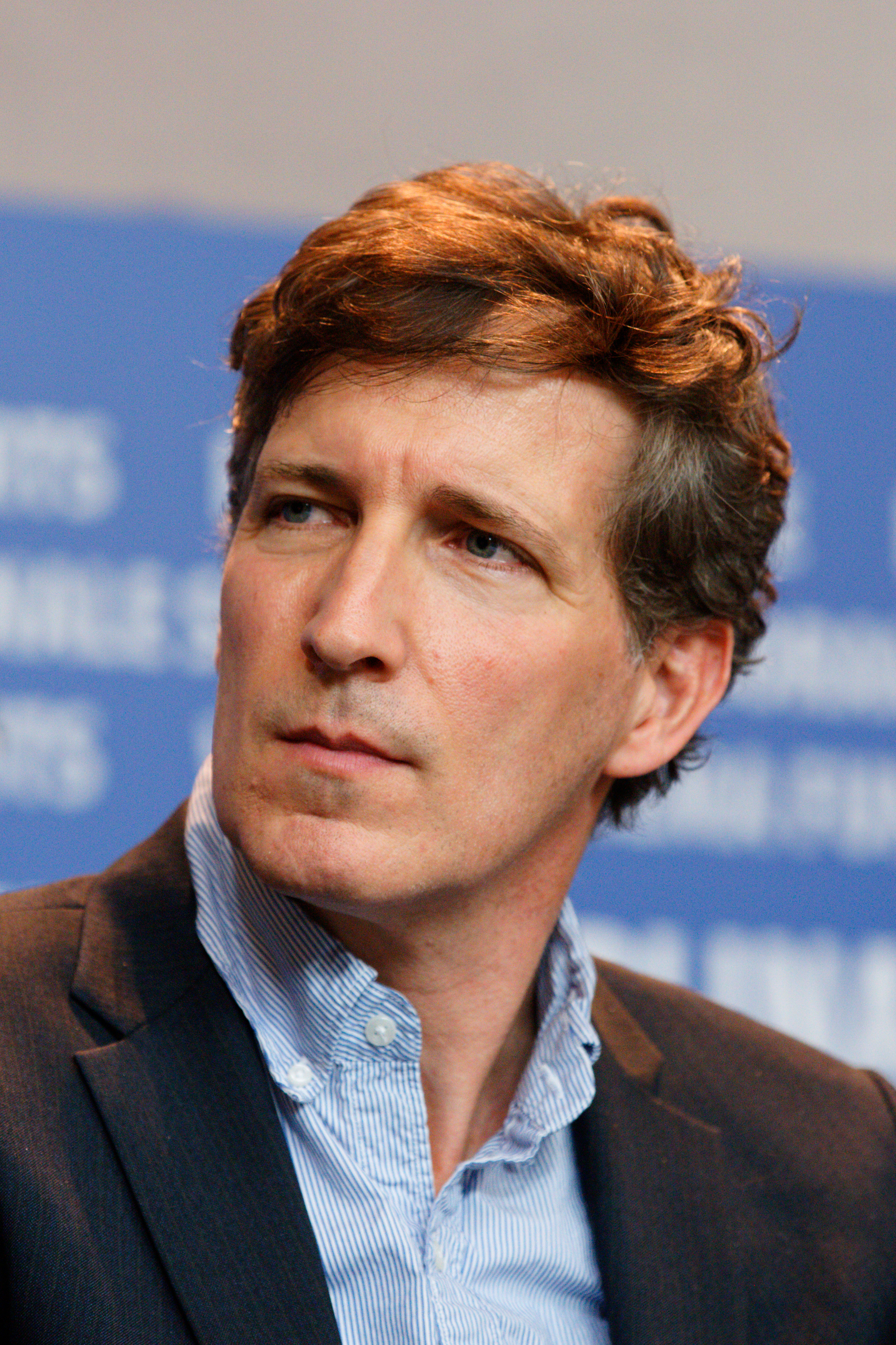
- Born: November 29, 1965 (age 60); Kansas City, Missouri, U.S.
- Education: Northwestern University
- Occupations: Actor; screenwriter; film director; film producer
- Years active: 1991–present
- Spouse: Brian Swardstrom

Peter Spears (born November 29, 1965) is an American actor and filmmaker. He was born in Kansas City, Missouri, and raised in Overland Park, Kansas. Spears is best known for winning an Oscar for producing Nomadland (2020), and for producing film Call Me by Your Name (2017). He directed the underground cult-favorite short film Ernest and Bertram, which portrayed Sesame Street characters Bert and Ernie as gay lovers, and developed the television series Nightmare Cafe and John from Cincinnati.

== Career ==
In 2020, Spears founded his own production company, Cor Cordium. The company has multiple projects in development across film and television. Recent films include Queer and Bones and All, directed by Luca Guadagnino, and Drift, which premiered at the 2023 Sundance Film Festival. Upcoming work includes On Swift Horses, directed by Daniel Minahan and starring Daisy Edgar-Jones, Jacob Elordi, Diego Calva, Will Poulter and Sasha Calle, which will be released April 25, 2025 by Sony Pictures Classics.

Spears's most successful production is Nomadland, which won an Oscar at the 93rd Academy Awards ceremony in 2021. The film also won the BAFTA, Golden Globe, PGA Award, and the Golden Lion at the 2021 Venice Film Festival. Spears also produced the critically acclaimed 2017 film Call Me by Your Name, and was nominated for the Academy Award for Best Picture. He directed the underground cult-favorite short film Ernest and Bertram, which portrayed Sesame Street characters Bert and Ernie as gay lovers in a loose parody of Lillian Hellman's The Children's Hour.

In addition to his career as a film director and producer, Spears is also an actor, appearing in films such as Call Me By Your Name, Something's Gotta Give, The Opposite of Sex, and Father of the Bride Part II, as well as several television series, including Friends and E.R. He was most recently seen in the film Sublet.

Spears also co-founded OutSet: The Young Filmmakers Project, a collaboration between the Outfest Film Festival and the Los Angeles LGBT Center. The 6-month film lab selects a group of diverse 16-to-24-year-old emerging filmmakers to share their stories through film, by embarking on courses in screenwriting, pre-production, production and post-production, mentored by industry experts. The program culminates in the filmmakers' final thesis projects presented at the Outfest Los Angeles LGBTQ Film Festival.

== Personal life ==
Spears is married to talent agent Brian Swardstrom, and the couple splits their time between upstate New York and California.

== Filmography ==
=== As actor ===
==== Film ====
Year	Title	Role	Notes
1995	Father of the Bride Part II	Dr. Wagner	—N/a
1998	The Opposite of Sex	Dr. Allen	—N/a
2003	Something's Gotta Give	Danny Benjamin	—N/a
2017	Call Me by Your Name	Isaac	Also producer
2020	Nomadland	Peter	Also producer
2020	Sublet	David	

==== Television ====
Year	Title	Role	Notes
1991	Pink Lightning	Greg	TV movie
1992	Murder Without Motive: The Edmund Perry Story	Student Proctor	TV movie
1992	Something to Live for: The Alison Gertz Story	Peter	TV movie
1993	Quantum Leap	Doug Bridges / Reiser	Episode: "Dr. Ruth"
1993	The Young Indiana Jones Chronicles	Robert Benchley	Episode: "Young Indiana Jones and the Scandal of 1920"
1993	Café Americain	Mark Durgin	Episode: "Pilot"
1994	Matlock	Barry Feldman	Two episodes
1994	Cries from the Heart	Jeff	TV movie
1996	ER	—N/a	Episode: "Baby Shower"
1996	Friends	Joel	Episode: "The One with Barry and Mindy's Wedding"
1997	The Love Bug	Young Dr. Stumpfel	TV movie
1999	Love Boat: The Next Wave	Jeff Blessing	Episode: "Blind Love"
2001	Some of My Best Friends	Terry	Two episodes
2004	CSI: Miami	Josh Dalton	Episode: "Deadline"

=== As writer ===
Year	Title	Notes
2002	Ernest and Bertram	Short film also director

=== As director ===
Year	Title	Notes
2002	Ernest and Bertram	Short film directorial debut
2007	Careless	—N/a

=== As producer ===
==== Film ====
Year	Title	Notes
1996	Scream, Teen, Scream!	Short film
2014	Until We Could	Short film
2017	Call Me by Your Name	Nominated – Academy Award for Best Picture
2020	Nomadland	Academy Award for Best Picture
2022	Bones and All	
2023	Drift	
2024	Queer	Executive producer
2024	On Swift Horses	

==== Television ====
Year	Title	Notes
1992	Nightmare Café	Co-developer; Creative consultant Executive producer
2007	John from Cincinnati	Co-developer; Creative consultant Executive producer
