= Margaret Wickens Pearce =

20th and 21st-century Potawatomi American cartographer

- Born: 1965 (age 60–61)
- Education: Hampshire College (BA); Clark University (Phd)
- Occupation: Cartographer
- Employers: Humboldt State Uni (1998–2001); Ohio University (2005–2010); University of Kansas (2010–2016)
- Known for: Mapping North American Indigenous peoples' land and place
- Awards: Guggenheim Fellowship (2023); MacArthur Fellowship (2025)

Margaret Wickens Pearce (born 1965) is a Citizen Potawatomi Nation cartographer known for creating maps that foreground Indigenous Peoples' understanding of land and place. Pearce pushes the boundaries of cartography beyond two-dimensional depictions of static and defined spaces. She draws on a wide range of archival materials and long-term collaborations with Indigenous communities to resurface their history, knowledge, and presence throughout North America.

== Early life and education ==
Pearce grew up in Rochester, New York and graduated with a Bachelor of Arts in Geography from Hampshire College in 1989 and a Ph.D. in Geography from Clark University in 1998. She held faculty positions at Humboldt State University (1998–2001), Ohio University (2005–2010), and the University of Kansas (2010–2016).

== Career and artistic practice ==
She taught at Humboldt State University, Ohio University, and University of Kansas.

She operates Studio 1:1 in Rockland, Maine.

In 2023, she was awarded a Guggenheim Fellowship in Geography & Environmental Studies. In 2025, she was recognized for her innovative contributions to the field of cartography and Indigenous studies by the MacArthur Fellowship.

== See also ==
- Native American studies

== Projects ==
- "Coming Home to Indigenous Place Names in Canada". Canadian-American Center. June 2, 2025.
- "The Cold at Inuit Nunangat". Canadian-American Center. October 6, 2025.
