= The Time of Our Singing =

Novel by Richard Powers

- First edition
- Author: Richard Powers
- Language: English
- Publisher: Farrar Straus & Giroux
- Publication date: 2002
- Publication place: United States
- Media type: Print
- Pages: 640 pp
- ISBN: 0-374-70467-8
- OCLC: 254475480
- Preceded by: Plowing the Dark
- Followed by: The Echo Maker

The Time of Our Singing (2003) is a novel by American writer Richard Powers. It tells the story of two brothers, Jonah and Joseph Strom, who are involved in music, and explores issues of prejudice. Their parents, David Strom and Delia Daley, met at Marian Anderson's 1939 concert on the steps of the Lincoln Memorial after she had been barred from any other legitimate concert venue because she insisted that the audience be integrated. The story goes back and forth between the generations, describing the unusual coupling of a German-Jewish physicist (David) who has lost his family in the Holocaust and a black woman from Philadelphia (Delia), both of whom have strong musical backgrounds. They impart their love of music to their family. Their two boys study music and become professional musicians: one a singer, the other a pianist. The parent's third child, their daughter Ruth, becomes a militant black activist.

This is a complex epic novel juxtaposing historical events throughout most of the twentieth century, depicting racism and the development of civil rights efforts, and the author's love and knowledge of music and physics. The book can be read on many levels, but those who have at least some familiarity with music will find a plethora of references to music of all eras and styles.

An opera was written based on the book by Kris Defoort. The opera premiered in La Monnaie in Brussels in September 2021.

== Music referenced in the book ==
Powers makes references to "Time Stands Still" by John Dowland (1563–1626) on page 4 and "Carmen" by Georges Bizet on page 9 as well as other works and composers.

== Physics referenced in the book ==
- General Relativity - Page 9
- Second Law of Thermodynamics - Page 88

== Critical reception ==
The novel won the 2004 Ambassador Book Award for fiction, won the 2004 WH Smith Literary Award, and was a finalist for the National Book Critics Circle Award the year before.
