= Ernest and Bertram =

- Directed by: Peter Spears
- Screenplay by: Peter Spears and TC Smith
- Based on: Sesame Street, The Children's Hour
- Produced by: Peter Spears
- Starring: Rob Helms; TC Smith; Philip Pavel (voice); Quinton Flynn (voice)
- Cinematography: Aaron Barnes, Thomas Richter
- Edited by: Steven Friedland
- Release date: 2002
- Running time: 8 minutes
- Country: United States
- Language: English

Ernest & Bertram is a 2002 tragicomedy short film written and directed by Peter Spears. The film spoofs Sesame Street characters Ernie and Bert. The film is based on Lillian Hellman's The Children's Hour and depicts Ernie and Bert after they are outed by Variety magazine. Although the film was a success at the Sundance Film Festival and the U.S Comedy Arts Festival, it kept from further distribution when Sesame Workshop served the film's producers with a cease and desist order for copyright violation.

== Synopsis ==
When the film starts, Miss Piggy has discontinued a romantic relationship with Bert when rumors of the roommates being gay hit the media. After Ernie arrives home, the two converse, and upon learning of the break-up, reveals that he does love Bert "that way". Bert seems not to share this sentiment, resulting in Ernie's suicide.
