= Citizen Potawatomi Nation =

American Indian tribe in Oklahoma, United States

Shishibe'niyek

Total population
- 37,264

Regions with significant populations
- United States (Oklahoma)

Languages
- Potawatomi, English

Religion
- Mide Religion or Medicine Lodge Religion, Native American Church, Christianity

Related ethnic groups
- Council of Three Fires (Odawa, Potawatomi, and Ojibwe)

The Citizen Potawatomi Nation (Potawatomi: Shishibe'niyek) is a federally recognized tribe of Potawatomi people located in Oklahoma. The Potawatomi are traditionally an Algonquian-speaking Eastern Woodlands tribe. They have 40,000 enrolled tribal citizens, of whom 10,312 live in the state of Oklahoma.

== Government ==
Map of Citizen Potawatomi Nation's tribal jurisdictional area (OTSA) and nearby jurisdiction areas. Shared with the Absentee Shawnee Tribe of Indians of Oklahoma.

The Citizen Potawatomi Nation is headquartered in Shawnee, Oklahoma. Their tribal jurisdictional area is in Cleveland and Pottawatomie Counties, Oklahoma. Of the 37,264 enrolled citizens, 10,312 live within the state of Oklahoma. They have their housing authority and issue tribal vehicle tags.

Enrollment in the tribe is based on lineal descent; that is to say, the tribe has no minimum blood quantum.

=== Current administration ===
The executive branch administration in 2025 are: Executive Branch:

- Chairman: John "Rocky" Barrett
- Vice Chairman: Linda Capps
- Secretary-Treasurer: D. Wayne Trousdale

Legislative Branch:

- District #1: Steve Livingston, Maumee, Ohio
- District #2: Eva Marie Carney, Arlington, VA
- District #3: Brenda Trevino, Shenandoah, TX
- District #4: Jon Boursaw, Topeka, KS
- District #5: Gene Lambert, Mesa, AZ
- District #6: Rande Payne, Visalia, CA
- District #7: Mark Johnson, Fresno, CA
- District #8: Dave Carney, Olympia, WA
- District #9: Paul Wesselhoft, Moore, OK
- District #10: David Barrett, Shawnee, OK
- District #11: Andy Walters, Shawnee, OK
- District #12: Paul Schmidlkofer, Tecumseh, OK
- District #13: Bobbie Bowden, Choctaw, OK

== Economic development ==
They operate a truck stop, two gas stations, two smoke shops, a bingo hall, two tribal casinos, FireLake Discount Foods in Shawnee, FireLake Golf Course, and First National Bank and Trust, with two locations in Shawnee, one in Holdenville, two in Lawton, and three in communities surrounding Lawton. Their estimated annual economic impact in 2011 was $422.4 million. In March 2023 the nation was preparing the launch of tribal-owned Sovereign Pipe Technologies, LLC., an HDPE pipe manufacturer, being the first business located at the tribe's 700-acre industrial park called Iron Horse. The industrial park, located about 35 minutes west of Oklahoma City near Shawnee, is less than 10 miles from Interstate 40 and has a connection to the national rail network through the Arkansas-Oklahoma Railroad (AOK).

== Culture ==
In January 2006, the tribe opened its extensive Citizen Potawatomi Nation Museum and Cultural Heritage Center in Shawnee. The 36,000-square-foot (3,300 m^{2}) building houses the nation's research library, archives, genealogy research center, veteran's Wall of Honor, exhibit and meeting space, and a museum store.

The tribe's annual intertribal powwow is no longer held. The Citizen Potawatomi Nation's Family Reunion Festival is held on the final Saturday of June each year. It attracts about 5,000 CPN citizens and their relatives for a variety of cultural and other activities over three days.

== History ==
The Citizen Potawatomi Nation is the successor apparent to the Mission Band of Potawatomi Indians, located originally in the Wabash River valley of Indiana. With the Indian Removal Act after the 1833 Treaty of Chicago, the Mission Band was forced to march to a new reserve in Kansas. Of the 850 Potawatomi people forced to move, more than 40 died along the way. The event is known in Potawatomi history as the Potawatomi Trail of Death.

In Kansas, the Mission Band of Potawatomi lived on a small reserve with the Prairie Band Potawatomi Nation. The Prairie Band had adapted to the Plains culture but the Mission Band remained steadfast to the Woodlands culture. The two groups exhibited very different ceremonial and subsistence strategies, yet were forced to share the land. Seeking a better opportunity for their people, the Mission Band leaders chose to take small farms rather than live together with the Prairie Band. Shortly thereafter, with the Potawatomi not fully understanding the tax system, most of the new individual allotments of land passed out of Mission Band ownership and into the hands of white settlers and traders. In 1867, Mission Potawatomi citizens signed a treaty selling their Kansas lands in order to purchase lands in Indian Territory with the proceeds. To reinforce the new land purchase and learning from their Kansas experience, tribal citizens took U.S. citizenship. From that time on, they became known as the Citizen Potawatomi.

By the early 1870s, most of the Citizen Potawatomi had resettled in Indian Territory, present-day Oklahoma, forming several communities near present-day Shawnee. In 1890, the Citizen Potawatomi participated, unwillingly, in the allotment process implemented through the Dawes Act of 1887. Under this Act, the Citizen Potawatomi people were forced to accept individual allotments again. In the Land Run of 1891, the remainder of the Potawatomi reservation in Oklahoma was opened up to non-Indian settlement, with the result that about 450 square miles (1,200 km^{2}) of the reservation was given away by the government to settlers.

== Notable tribal citizens ==
- Woody Crumbo (1912–1989), artist, flautist, dancer
- Mary Killman (born 1991), Olympic synchronized swimmer
- Robin Wall Kimmerer (born 1953), environmental scientist, educator, author
- Tyler Bray (born 1991), an American football quarterback
- Ron Baker (born 1993), retired basketball player
- Kellie Coffey (born 1971), singer, songwriter, winner of Academy of Country Music Award for Top New Female in 2003
- Creed Humphrey (born 1999), All-Pro center for the Kansas City Chiefs
- Veronica Cortez (born 2004), Miss Alaska for America in 2023
- Kyle Powys Whyte, Philosopher and environmental justice scholar
- Angela R. Riley, chief justice of Citizen Potawatomi Nation (2010–present)
- Margaret Wickens Pearce, cartographer and 2025 MacArthur Fellow
- Sean McCann (born 1971), member-elect of the United States House of Representatives for Michigan's 4th congressional district

== See also ==
- Potawatomi
- Forest County Potawatomi Community, Wisconsin
- Hannahville Indian Community, Michigan
- Match-e-be-nash-she-wish Band of Pottawatomi Indians of Michigan
- Nottawaseppi Huron Band of the Potawatomi, Michigan
- Pokagon Band of Potawatomi Indians, Michigan and Indiana
- Prairie Band of Potawatomi Nation, Kansas
