= The Echo Maker =

2006 novel by Richard Powers

- Front cover and spine of first edition
- Author: Richard Powers
- Language: English
- Genre: Novel
- Publisher: Farrar, Straus and Giroux
- Publication date: 2006
- Publication place: United States
- Media type: Print (hardcover)
- Pages: 464 pp
- ISBN: 0-374-14635-7
- OCLC: 62790370
- Dewey Decimal: 813/.54 22
- LC Class: PS3566.O92 E27 2006
- Preceded by: The Time of Our Singing

The Echo Maker is a 2006 novel by American writer Richard Powers. It won the National Book Award for Fiction and was a Pulitzer Prize for Fiction finalist.

== Plot introduction ==
On a winter night on a remote Nebraska road, twenty-seven-year-old Mark Schluter flips his truck in a near-fatal accident. His older sister, Karin, his only near kin, returns reluctantly to their hometown to nurse Mark back from a traumatic head injury. But when he emerges from a protracted coma, Mark believes that this woman — who looks, acts, and sounds just like his sister — is really an impostor. Shattered by her brother's refusal to recognize her, Karin contacts the cognitive neurologist Gerald Weber, famous for his case histories describing brain disorders. Weber recognized Mark's condition as a rare case of Capgras syndrome — the delusion that people in one's life are doubles or impostors — and eagerly investigates.

What he discovers in Mark slowly undermines even his own sense of being. Meanwhile, Mark, armed only with a note left by an anonymous witness, attempts to learn what happened the night of his inexplicable accident.

== Characters ==
=== Main characters ===
- Karin Schluter quits her job as a service representative to return home to Kearney, Nebraska to care for her comatose brother.
- Mark Schluter has a mysterious truck rollover on a deserted country road and eventually comes out of a coma suffering from a variety of delusions.
- Gerald Weber is a popular writer of books on neurology who answers a personal email from Karin requesting that he come to Nebraska. Weber may be a partial fictionalization of Oliver Sacks, 1933–2015, who was a neurologist, best-selling author, and professor of neurology at NYU School of Medicine. Sacks was the author of a number of nonfiction books, beginning with Awakenings (1973) and The Man Who Mistook His Wife for a Hat (1985), which use case histories interwoven with explanatory narrative to describe a range of brain conditions that result in unusual manifestations of neurologic deficits, in much the way Weber does in The Echo Maker.

== Analysis ==
According to Richard Powers,

[The] aim in The Echo Maker is to put forward, at the same time, a glimpse of the solid, continuous, stable, perfect story we try to fashion about the world and about ourselves, while at the same time to lift the rug and glimpse the amorphous, improvised, messy, crack-strewn, gaping thing underneath all that narration. To this end, my technique was what some scholars of narrative have called double voicing. Every section of the book (until a few passages at the end) is so closely focalized through Mark, Karin, or Weber that even the narration of material event is voiced entirely through their cognitive process: the world is nothing more than what these sensibilities assemble, without any appeal to outside authority.

In a review in the New York Review of Books, Margaret Atwood described the novel's "underlying sketch" as being from The Wonderful Wizard of Oz.

Colson Whitehead, writing in The New York Times, called it a "post-911 novel .. not an elegy for How We Used to Live or a salute to Coming to Grips, but a quiet exploration of how we survive, day to day."

In February 2022, a fan brought a copy of the book into a concert by rapper and artist Tyler, the Creator at Little Caesars Arena in Detroit. During the show, the rapper noticed the fan reading the book, and requested for it to be brought on stage. When a security guard passed the book up onto the stage, Tyler briefly read the back of the book before calling the book “trash” and making fun of the fan, encouraging other audience members to “call him names”.

== See also ==
- Sandhill crane
