= Orfeo (novel) =

2014 novel by Richard Powers

- Cover to first edition hardback
- Author: Richard Powers
- Cover artist: Raymond Martinez/Millennium Images, UK
- Language: English
- Published: 2014 (W. W. Norton & Company)
- Publication place: United States
- Media type: Print (hardback)
- Pages: 369
- ISBN: 978-0-393-24082-5

Orfeo is a novel by American author Richard Powers.

Orfeo tells the story of 70-year-old avant-garde composer Peter Els, whose home experiments in biohacking musical patterns into a bacterial human pathogen, Serratia marcescens, have attracted the worried hazmat-suit-level attention of Homeland Security. Els flees in panic, and becomes known as the "Bioterrorist Bach". The novel interleaves Els' attempt at a final redemption with a retrospective telling of his life.

== Plot summary ==
There are two main narrative threads in the novel, both centered on Peter Els. The novel begins and ends in the winter of 2011, from the accidental discovery by the authorities that Els was doing home genetic experiments to his flight across the country. Interspersed is the story of Els' life, from his birth in 1941 to his decision in 2009 to record his music in DNA.

=== Biographical narrative ===
Els is born in 1941. He turns out to be naturally talented in math, science, and classical music, and is especially enraptured by a recording of Mozart's Jupiter Symphony.

A cellist in his high school, Clara Reston, becomes his first love. He follows her to college in Indiana, intending to major in chemistry. Clara convinces him to major in music and to become a composer. She ends up in England, and dumps him long distance.

Els develops under the avant-garde influence of the day, including that of John Cage. A soprano Madolyn "Maddy" Corr who sings his strange songs becomes his next lover and eventually his wife. A particularly energetic, chaotic and anarchistic dramatist, Richard Bonner, choreographs Els' work.

Els and Maddy marry and have a daughter Sara. They move to Boston where she starts a career at a prestigious private school, while Els settles for being a watchman at an art museum and stay-at-home father.

After a few years, Bonner's fringe career in Manhattan artsy circles gets a surprise wealthy sponsor, and Bonner invites Els to compose for his works. Because it involves frequent trips to Manhattan, Maddy sours on Els, and at some point gives Els an ultimatum, and he chooses composing, and they divorce. She remarries almost immediately and moves to Saint Louis, taking Sara with her.

Working with Bonner eventually becomes impossible, and Els breaks off with him. He tries to lose himself, first in menial labor and then in New Hampshire.

Visiting England on the death of his mother, he learns that he has inherited nicely. He runs into Clara, and refuses to reconnect with her.

In the early 1990s, he is surprised by a visit from Bonner. Bonner has been asked to stage an avant-garde opera, and wants Els to compose the music. In brainstorming ideas, Els suggests the 1530s Münster Rebellion, and the two are on fire. But shortly before the premiere, the Waco siege ends in a massacre, and Els is sickened, whereas the media, the opera company, Bonner, and potential attendees find the coincidence exciting. Els returns to seclusion, and has to break off relations with Bonner again, using fisticuffs, and suppresses all further productions.

Two years later, a former colleague from Indiana offers Els an adjunct teaching position at a small college in Pennsylvania. Els accepts. By now his relations with his daughter have normalized, and she gets him a dog.

The 2008 financial crisis forces the small college to let Els go, and in his boredom, and fretful over his declining mental powers, Els conceives the idea of recording his compositions in bacterial DNA.

=== Bioterrorism scare narrative ===
When Els' dog Fidelio dies, Els calls 9-1-1 in a panic. He realizes his mistake and hangs up, but two police officers are dispatched to his house anyway. They chat in a friendly manner, but the home laboratory set up disturbs the police officers, and the next day two agents from the "Joint Security Agency" pay a visit. They ask technical questions, learn how he assembled everything on the cheap, and decide to take the precaution of confiscating his incubator, entirely unconcerned about issues of legality.

The next day, after a pre-dawn early jog, he heads back home and finds a media circus has popped up while biohazard teams strip his house, even unburying his dog. Upset, he considers his options, and decides to teach his scheduled weekly music appreciation class at a local retirement home without cleaning up. Afterwards, one of the home members, learning of his situation, offers her son's vacation cabin as a place of refuge, which he accepts.

From there, he begins an odyssey taking him back to Indiana, then visiting his ex-wife in St. Louis. She points him to Bonner in Arizona, who is in early-stage Alzheimer's. He encourages him to tweet his story to the world, one last hurrah performance with the biggest audience he's ever had, as they both agree the Feds will crush Els.

Els then visits his daughter, who has spent the past several days arranging potential legal defenses. Arriving at night, they talk. Els hears the arrival of numerous security forces, and takes a glass bud vase, shaped like a chemistry flask. Sara realizes belatedly what is happening outside, and starts to lose it. The novel ends with Els saying some last words to his daughter, intending to run out, holding the vase high, the "downbeat of a little infinity."

== Inspiration ==
Parts of the story of Peter Els are closely modeled on events in the life of bioartist Steve Kurtz. In 2004, Kurtz called 9-1-1 after the death of his wife. Police assumed his home laboratory was suspicious, and called in the FBI, leading to charges of bioterrorism and mail and wire fraud.

Powers, in an earlier visit to Stanford, spent time assisting in the laboratory of biochemist Aaron Straight, which helped shape the details of Els' DIY lab. Powers also learned, from English professor and novelist John L'Heureux, of the neurological problems that are sometimes associated with aging and music, and in the novel, a fictional Dr. L'Heureux diagnoses Els with these problems.

== Music ==
Music, including descriptions, history, and its effects on listeners, form a major portion of the narrative. Prominent are:

- Gustav Mahler, Kindertotenlieder, which Els plays to accompany the burial of his dog.
- Olivier Messiaen, Quartet for the End of Time, which Els associates with his birth, and plays to dramatic effect in a retirement home just before he flees.
- Dmitri Shostakovich, Fifth Symphony, which Els listens to when expecting to get arrested at any moment.
- Harry Partch, Barstow, whose sources Els tries to locate, as he envisions himself being forced to live off the grid.
- Peter Lieberson, Neruda Songs
- Steve Reich, Proverb

== Reception ==
The novel has been reviewed widely. It received starred reviews from both Kirkus Reviews and Publishers Weekly. Elizabeth Sile, in Esquire, wrote that "Powers proves, once again, that he's a master of the novel with Orfeo", while David Ulin of the Los Angeles Times called the book "magnificent and moving".

Jim Holt, the New York Times reviewer, found the novel emotionally satisfying, but intellectually repellent, in reverse of the criticism sometimes given to previous novels by Powers. In particular, Holt is aghast at the very idea of Els' vandalizing genomes.

Orfeo was included on the longlist for the 2014 Man Booker Prize, the first year that the prize admitted novels from across the globe.
