= Loving Frank =

2007 American novel by Nancy Horan

- Author: Nancy Horan
- Cover artist: Barbara M. Bachman
- Language: English
- Genre: Biographical novel
- Publisher: Random House
- Publication date: August 7, 2007
- Publication place: United States
- Media type: Print (hardback and paperback)
- Pages: 362 pp (first edition, paperback)
- ISBN: 978-0-345-49500-6 (first edition, hardcover)
- OCLC: 187394634
- Dewey Decimal: 813/.6 22
- LC Class: PS3608.O725 L68 2008

Loving Frank is a 2007 American novel by Nancy Horan. It tells the story of Mamah Borthwick's illicit love affair with Frank Lloyd Wright and the public shame they experienced in early twentieth century America. It is a fictionalised account told from Borthwick's perspective, based on research conducted by Horan, and it is her debut novel. It depicts Borthwick’s life as it became intertwined with Wright's between the years of 1907 through 1914. By following the artistic aspirations and travels of the two main protagonists, the novel portrays the social mores of the times in the United States and Europe.

== Plot summary ==
The book opens with a note by Borthwick, reminiscing on her life and expressing her longing to give her perspective on what happened. The story begins with an account of Borthwick's attendance at a public talk in Oak Park given by Frank Lloyd Wright, a famous architect of the Chicago School. The author reveals that some years earlier, Wright had designed Borthwick's house at the insistence of her husband Edwin Cheney. Wright and Borthwick begin a tumultuous and intermittent affair while they are working together on the architectural plans for the house.

The novel is an introspective portrayal of Borthwick's emotional turmoil as an intellectual, wife, mother, friend, and member of society. It also touches on Wright's personality and human traits in addition to his artistic talent and eccentricities. Throughout the novel, Borthwick explains the artistic or philosophical underpinnings of Wright's extravagant views. The novel goes deep into their family situations and internal conflicts, and allows the reader to see Wright through the lens of Borthwick’s deep admiration. The Swedish feminist Ellen Key unnerves Borthwick when she declares that Borthwick may have followed Wright in order to bask in his brilliance rather than accomplishing anything she can claim as her own.

== Themes ==
- Women's independence: “Before Mamah came over to Germany, Mattie had said to her, 'What will you do if Frank returns to his wife? You’ll have nothing.' But Mamah felt now that if that came to be, she had more than nothing. All the rest, it seemed, had just floated away.” (Horan 185). Mamah Borthwick Cheney was a pioneer for women’s independence. She struggled with how a woman who wanted her own self-expression could "fulfill the traditional-bound, justly demanding needs of her children” (New York Times 03). “Mamah, a brilliant woman with a college degree, was not suited to the role allotted to educated women of her time. She simply could not breathe” (Los Angeles Times 01). Mamah is “a symbol of both the freedoms women yearn to have and of the consequences that may await when they try to take them” (New York Times 03).
- Reputation: "Mrs. Cheney and Wright Elope Again. Famous Chicago Architect Lives with Divorcee in Seclusion at Hillside, Wis.; Leaves Wife at Home Forgiven After First Escapade, He Now Tacks Rent Sign on Residence” (Horan 241). The love affair between Frank Lloyd Wright and Mamah Borthwick Cheney both “shocked Chicago society and forever changed their lives” (Random House 02). They left a lot behind when they fled Oak Park for Europe in 1909, including two spouses and nine children between the two of them. The effects of their affair were widespread, and not just within their own families. “Beyond its shock value, the outcome would have ramifications . . . for architects, feminists, criminologists and armchair moralists of every stripe” (International Herald Tribune 02).
- Morality: “Mamah Cheney followed her heart at any cost” (Los Angeles Times 01). “As she leaves her home and children, she examines and reexamines the moral basis of her choice” (Los Angeles 01). She is no longer in love with her husband, Edwin, and wants to begin living her own life, rather than living in a role assigned to her by society. “She feels completely reborn in body and mind through her relationship with Wright” (Los Angeles 01).

== Characters ==
- Mamah Borthwick: Her full name is Martha Bouton Borthwick Cheney. She is the protagonist of the book, who is involved in an affair with famous architect Frank Lloyd Wright. She is well-educated and an advocate for women's rights. She leaves her children to go to Europe with Wright. She struggles to come to terms with internal and external conflicts, and eventually gets murdered by Julian Carlton.
- Frank Lloyd Wright: Brilliant architect. Involved in affair with Mamah. His mother's favorite, pampered him as child. Considers himself so fascinating and such a genius that people should be honored to work with him. Often spends money he doesn't have.
- Catherine Wright: Wright's wife. Refuses to divorce him despite his ongoing long-term affair.
- Edwin Cheney: Mamah's husband. Loyal to Mamah but allows the divorce.
- Martha Cheney: Mamah’s and Edwin's daughter. Too young to remember much about her mother when she leaves.
- John Cheney: Mamah’s and Edwin's son. Very close with his mother before she leaves. When she returns, she finds that he has changed.
- Lizzie Borthwick: Mamah's sister. A devoted sister who remains single and lives in the Cheney household. Takes care of Mamah's children before and after she leaves.
- Jessie Borthwick: Mamah's sister who died from complications during childbirth.
- Dickie Bock: Artist who works for Wright at Oak Park Studio.
- Marion Mahony Griffin: Female architect who works with Wright.
- Robert Herrick: Mamah's professor at the University of Chicago.
- Mattie Brown: Mamah's close childhood friend. Dies shortly after giving birth to a child.
- Alden Brown: Mattie's husband. A miner.
- Ernst Wasmuth: Works with Wright as a German publisher intent on publicizing Wright’s architectural ideas in Europe. Publishes a two-volume folio of 100 lithographs known as the Wasmuth Portfolio.
- Ellen Key: Renowned advocate for the women's movement in Europe. Based in Sweden. Inspires Mamah and engages her to translate her work.
- Walter Burley Griffin: Architect who works with Wright in Chicago. Wright owes him money. Marries Marion Mahony.
- Taylor Woolley: Architect who works with Wright in Europe. A good friend of both Wright’s and Mamah's.
- Else Lasker-Schuler: Poet who befriends Mamah at Café des Westens in Germany where she teaches and takes language classes.
- Jennie Porter: Wright's sister. Has a son named Frankie.
- Billy Weston: Workman for Wright at Taliesin.
- Anna Wright: Wright's mother. Smart woman who pampers Wright as a child and adult.
- Josiah: Young carpenter apprentice for Wright at Taliesin.
- Elinor Millor Cheney: Edwin's second wife.
- Emil Brodelle: Wright's drafting man at Taliesin.
- Gertrude Carlton: Cook married to Julian Carlton.
- Julian Carlton: Employed by Wright at Taliesin. Goes crazy and kills Mamah, her two children, and two of Wright's workmen. Attempts suicide. Dies in prison due to starvation.
- John Lloyd Wright: Wright's son. Works with Wright on some projects.

== Wright's architecture ==
Several important buildings by Frank Lloyd Wright play a role in Loving Frank.

- Frank Lloyd Wright Home and Studio: Located in Oak Park. Designed in his Prairie School style.
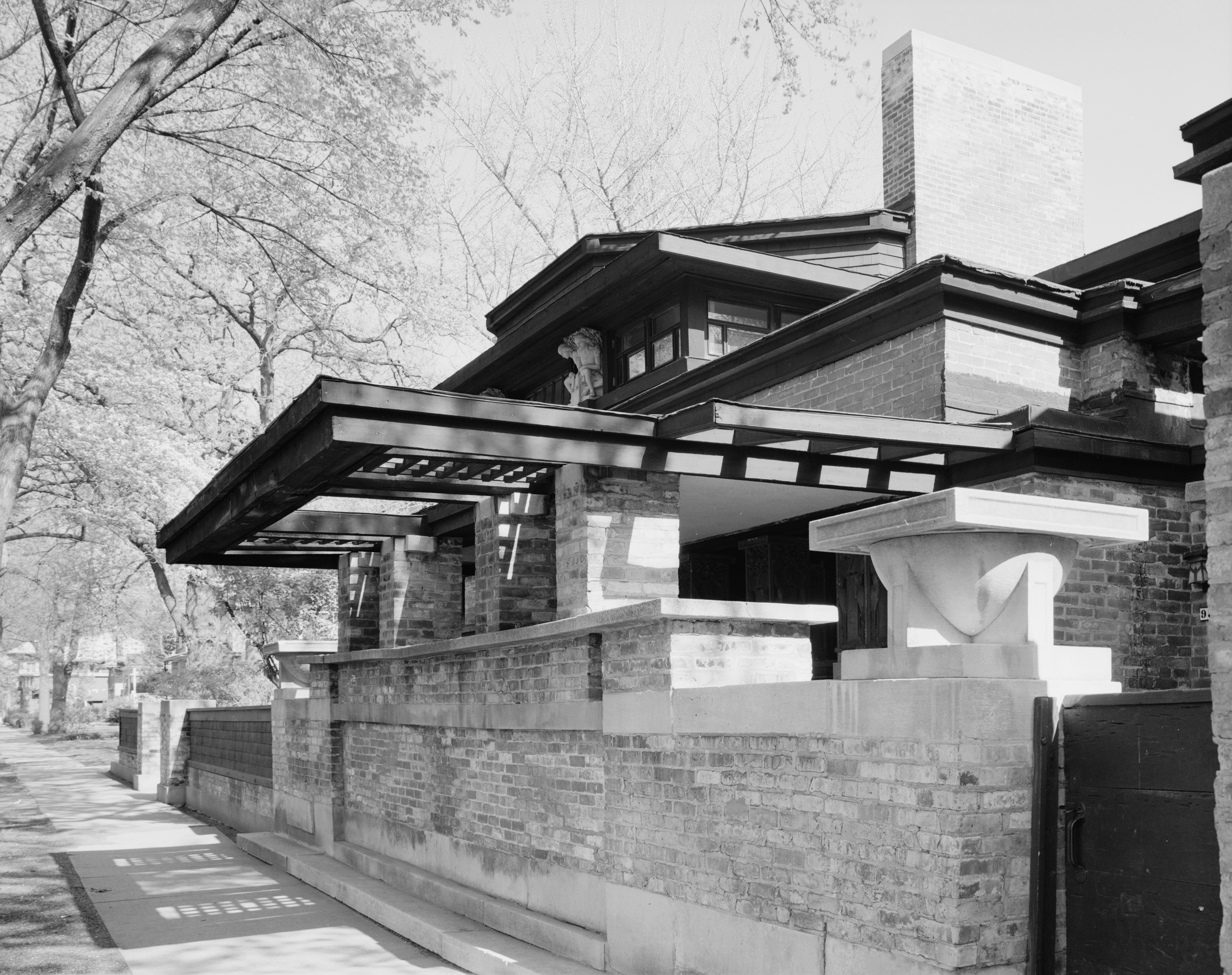
Frank Lloyd Wright Home and Studio.
- Edwin H. Cheney House: Wright helped Borthwick and Cheney with its design.
- Tan-Y-Deri: Wright's sister's home. Name means "Under the Oaks".
- Taliesin: Built for Wright's life with Borthwick. Burned down by Julian Carlton and later rebuilt by Wright.
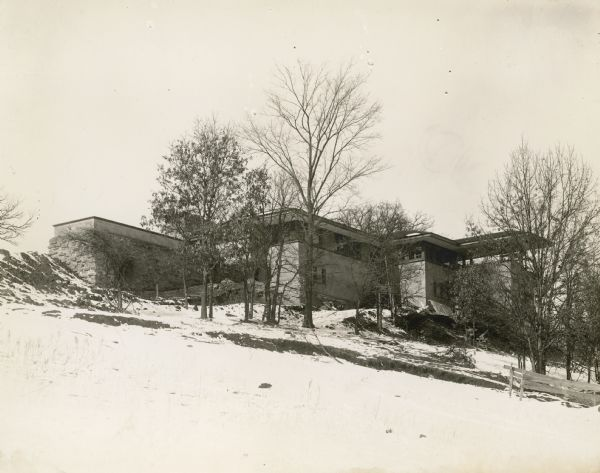

== Sources ==
- Horan, Nancy. Loving Frank, New York, NY: Ballantine Books, 2008.
- Maslin, Janet. International Herald Tribune Book Review: Loving Frank. 03 Aug. 2007. 26 Oct. 2008 <http://www.iht.com/articles/2007/08/03/arts/06book.php>.
- "Random House, Inc." Loving Frank. 26 Oct. 2008 <http://www.randomhouse.com/catalog/display.pperl/9780345502254.html>.
- Schillinger, Liesl. New York Times, Notes on a Scandal. 23 Sept. 2007. 26 Oct. 2008 <https://www.nytimes.com/2007/09/23/books/review/schillinger-t.html>.
- Winik, Marion. Los Angeles Times, Breaking Away. 19 Aug. 2007. 26 Oct. 2008 <https://www.latimes.com/archives/la-xpm-2007-aug-19-bk-winik19-story.html>.
