= The Overstory =

2018 novel by Richard Powers

- First edition cover
- Author: Richard Powers
- Cover artist: Albert Bierstadt (art); Evan Gaffney (design)
- Language: English
- Genre: Environmental fiction
- Publisher: W. W. Norton & Company
- Publication date: April 3, 2018
- Publication place: United States
- Media type: Print
- Pages: 612
- Awards: Pulitzer Prize for Fiction (2019)
- ISBN: 978-0-393-63552-2 (hardcover)
- OCLC: 988292556
- Dewey Decimal: 813/.54
- LC Class: PS3566.O92 O94 2018

The Overstory is a novel by American author Richard Powers, published in 2018 by W. W. Norton & Company. The book follows nine Americans whose unique life experiences with trees bring them together to address the destruction of forests. It features an innovative and non-linear narrative structure and explores themes of environmental activism and humanity's relationship with the natural world.

Powers has said that the book Braiding Sweetgrass: Indigenous Wisdom, Scientific Knowledge, and the Teachings of Plants by Robin Wall Kimmerer helped shape his novel: "So much of 'The Overstory' is imbued with Robin's vision of the agency of plants, seeing them as complex creatures that have a kind of intelligence."

The book received widespread critical acclaim and won several major literary awards, including the 2019 Pulitzer Prize for Fiction and the 2020 William Dean Howells Medal. It was shortlisted for the 2018 Man Booker Prize.

== Plot summary ==
The Overstory interweaves the stories of nine main characters whose lives become connected to trees and forests. The narrative spans multiple generations and locations across the United States.

In the mid-1800s, Jørgen Hoel plants six chestnuts on his Iowa farm. Only one survives a blight, and subsequent generations of Hoels photograph this tree monthly. The tradition continues until Nicholas Hoel, an art student, finds his family dead from a gas leak.

Olivia Vandergriff, a college student, experiences a near-death experience that leads her to join environmental activists in California. On her journey west, she meets Nicholas, and they join forces to protect old-growth forests.

Adam Appich, a psychology student, becomes involved with the activists while researching group behavior. Mimi Ma, an engineer, and Douglas Pavlicek, a Vietnam War veteran, also join the movement to save the redwoods.

Patricia Westerford, a dendrologist, faces ridicule for her theories about tree communication but later gains recognition for her groundbreaking research. Neelay Mehta, a computer programmer, creates a virtual world inspired by the complexity of forest ecosystems.

As the activists' efforts intensify, they resort to more extreme measures. Olivia, Nicholas, Adam, Mimi, and Douglas form a group that engages in eco-terrorism, burning logging equipment. During their final mission, an explosion kills Olivia.

The group disbands. Twenty years later, Douglas turns himself in to protect Mimi and identifies Adam as an accomplice. Adam, now a successful psychology professor, is arrested and sentenced to a lengthy prison term. Nicholas becomes a drifter, creating environmental art. Mimi changes her identity and becomes a therapist.

Neelay leaves his company and creates artificial intelligences to learn about Earth's biomes. Patricia continues her research and establishes a seed bank to preserve plant species. She is invited to speak at a conference of influential people, where she delivers a powerful message about saving the world, before almost taking her own life onstage. Nick continues to make art, and the novel finishes with the completion of an enormous natural sculpture that spells out the word "STILL" big enough to be seen from space.

== Characters ==
The novel features a diverse cast of characters, each with their own unique connection to trees and the environment:

- Douglas Pavlicek – a Vietnam War veteran who survives a crash landing by falling into a tree. He becomes an environmental activist but later works for the forest service. Douglas betrays the cause by turning in Adam, leading to the latter's conviction.
- Olivia Vandergriff – after a near-death experience, Olivia becomes deeply involved in radical environmentalism, particularly focused on saving redwoods. She dies in an act of arson committed by her group.
- Patricia Westerford – a hearing-impaired botanist who develops unconventional theories about plant consciousness and tree communication. She faces challenges in gaining acceptance from the scientific community for her groundbreaking work. The character was heavily inspired by the life and work of UBC forest ecologist Suzanne Simard. In the story, Westerford pens a popular science book, The Secret Forest, whose title alludes to real-world books such as The Hidden Life of Trees by the German forester Peter Wohlleben and The Secret Life of Trees by the British science writer Colin Tudge.
- Adam Appich – an academic who joins the group of environmental activists. His father planted a tree before the birth of each of his children; as a child, Adam conflated the characteristics of each tree with his siblings. He is eventually arrested and sentenced to a lengthy prison term.
- Mimi Ma – an engineer who becomes an environmental activist alongside Douglas. They form a romantic relationship.
- Nicholas Hoel – an artist who comes from a long line of farmers and whose great-great-great grandfather planted a chestnut tree that survived blight for decades and enthralled the Hoel family for generations.
- Ray Brinkman and Dorothy Cazaly – a married couple. Dorothy contemplates leaving Ray but ultimately stays with him after he suffers a brain aneurysm, finding new meaning in their relationship and connection to nature.
- Neelay Mehta – the child of Indian immigrants to California who becomes paralyzed after falling from a tree. He becomes a computer programming marvel, eventually creating a series of video games called Mastery.

== Reception ==
=== Critical reception ===
Major publications offered predominantly positive perspectives on the novel. In The New York Times, author Barbara Kingsolver praised its ambitious scope and intricate narrative structure, which she compared to the rings of a tree. Kingsolver particularly commended Powers's ability to weave together the lives of nine diverse characters through their connections to trees and the natural world, ultimately describing the work as an achievement that challenges readers' relationship with nature. Similarly, author Ron Charles, in The Washington Post, provided an enthusiastic endorsement, declaring that the "ambitious novel soars up through the canopy of American literature and remakes the landscape of environmental fiction".

In The Guardian, Benjamin Markovits lauded the book as an "astonishing performance", praising Powers's ambitious narrative structure and ability to generate "narrative momentum out of thin air, again and again". However, another Guardian reviewer criticized the work as an "increasingly absurd melodrama".

The Atlantic characterized the work as "darkly optimistic" in its perspective that while humanity might be doomed, trees would endure.

The Los Angeles Review of Books observed that "the human lives are only the novel's 'understory'", arguing that Powers successfully makes "a story of the considerably extended timeline of the trees, not the humans". Critics noted the work's formal innovation, with the Kenyon Review stating it "demonstrates that a novel doesn't have to come down to human emotion" and represents "an argument that [James] Wood's obsession with character... is actually a limitation".

== Awards and honors ==
Awards

- 2018 Man Booker Prize shortlist
- 2018 Grand Prix de Littérature Américaine winner
- 2019 2019 PEN/Jean Stein Book Award finalist
- 2019 2019 PEN/Faulkner Award finalist
- 2019 Pulitzer Prize for Fiction
- 2020 William Dean Howells Medal

Honors

- The novel is #24 on The New York Times' 100 Best Books of the 21st Century list.

== Adaptations ==
In February 2021, it was reported that Netflix was developing a television adaptation of the novel with David Benioff, D. B. Weiss, and Hugh Jackman executive-producing.
