= Operation Wandering Soul (novel) =

1993 novel by Richard Powers

- Cover to first edition hardback
- Author: Richard Powers
- Cover artist: Neil Stuart, based on Pieter Bruegel the Elder Massacre of the Innocents
- Language: English
- Published: 1993 (William Morrow and Company)
- Publication place: United States
- Media type: Print (hardback)
- Pages: 352
- ISBN: 0-688-11548-9

Operation Wandering Soul is a novel by American author Richard Powers. It was a finalist for the National Book Award.

Operation Wandering Soul tells the story of a children's ward in "Carver Hospital" from the point of view of Richard Kraft, an overworked surgical resident, and therapist Linda Espera. It is set in "Angel City".

The title comes from the Vietnam War psychological warfare operation of the same name, which Kraft's father was involved in.

The novel includes extensive material based on his teenage years growing up in Bangkok.

== Summary ==
The novel does not have a plot as such. Kraft and Espera treat a desperate range of children, including an Asian boat girl Joy Stepaneevong from Thailand, a progeria victim, a boy with no face, and numerous accident and crime victims. Joy turns out to own a good luck charm that Kraft recognizes as once being owned by his father, a necklace angel that his father lost in a helicopter while engaging in "Operation Wandering Soul", broadcasting alleged spirit messages.

The narrative is frequently interrupted with retellings of classic stories and histories of mistreated children, including the Children's Crusade, the Pied Piper, the evacuation of children from London during the Blitz, Anne Frank and the Holocaust, and the Münster Rebellion. The story of Peter Pan is told in counterpoint.

The children in the hospital stage their own version of the Pied Piper.

== Authorial presence ==
Critics of Powers' fiction commonly find parallels between Richard Powers and his main character. In Operation Wandering Soul, similar biographical details include their teenage years in Thailand. The name "Kraft" is German for "strength" or "force", suggestive of "powers".

== Reception ==
This book is not easy to love. It isn't seductive, and its characters don't spring quickly to life. Instead, Mr. Powers offers a devastating phantasmagoria of words and images.

— Meg Wolitzer, The New York Times
