= Isaiah Eleven =

Novel by Jesse Childs

- Author: Jesse Childs
- Genre: fiction
- Publisher: Research Associates School Times Publishing
- Publication date: January 7, 2008
- Pages: 296
- ISBN: 0-948390-98-0

Isaiah Eleven (2008) is an American novel written by Jesse Childs and published by Research Associates School Times Publishing.

Isaiah Eleven is set in Chicago during the early 21st century. The novel deals with themes of identity in a world after the attacks of September 11, 2001 in the United States, and the struggle of one youth to become a man while attending an elite college. The title character, Isaiah, comes from a troubled background and has found it difficult being on his own. The results of a DNA paternity test have shown Isaiah who his birth father is. The book explores how he deals with this and other issues.

== See also ==
- American literary regionalism
- Culture of the United States
