= Young Farmers (photograph) =

Photograph by August Sander

Young Farmers (1914) by August Sander

Young Farmers, also known as Three Farmers on their Way to a Dance, is a black and white photograph taken by August Sander in 1914. It is one of his better known photographs and it was included in his photographic book Face of Our Time (1929).

== Description ==
The picture depicts three young men standing in an empty landscape, wearing fine suits, hats and canes. All the three men are still and facing the camera, being caught on their action of going to a dance in a nearby village. Despite the title, the picture does not actually depict real farmers. Two of the men worked in an iron ore mine and the other at the mine's office. They all would fight in World War I, which started the same year, and one of them would die there. Their fashionable clothing and posture seem to give them a higher social status than they actually had.

The J. Paul Getty Museum website describes the picture: "Perhaps most striking about this portrait of three farmers walking along a country road on their way to a dance is their formal dress: each wears a hat and suit and carries a walking stick", "This formal appearance removes them from the reality of their occupations. Each man is seen from the side, glancing over his shoulder at the photographer; they stop only for a moment before continuing on their journey."

== Critical evaluation ==
Art critic John Berger wrote the book The Suit and the Photograph (1980), based on this photograph. He states: "The date is 1914. The three young men belong, at the very most, to the second generation who ever wore such suits in the European countryside. Twenty or 30 years earlier, such clothes did not exist at a price which peasants could afford."

== Identities and fate of the subjects ==
Later investigation has identified the young men in the picture as Otto Krieger, August Klein, and his cousin Ewald Klein. The three young men all came from the village of Dünebusch in western Germany and were likely on their way to a dance in the nearby town of Halscheid. They were actually not farmers: Otto and August worked in the iron ore mine, whereas Ewald worked in the iron ore mine's office. It has also been established that all the three young men were enlisted to fight for Germany in World War One in Belgium shortly after the photograph was taken, with August killed during the war.

== Cultural references ==
The photograph inspired the novel Three Farmers on Their Way to a Dance (1985), by American novelist Richard Powers.

== Public collections ==
There are prints of the photograph at the August Sander Archive, Photographische Sammlung/SK Stiftung Kultur, in Cologne, the Museum für Kunst und Gewerbe, in Hamburg, the Museum of Modern Art, in New York, and the J. Paul Getty Museum, in Los Angeles.
