= The Gold Bug Variations =

1991 book by Richard Powers

- First edition
- Author: Richard Powers
- Language: English
- Publisher: William Morrow & Company
- Publication date: August 1, 1991
- Publication place: United States
- Media type: Print (hardback & paperback)
- ISBN: 0-688-09891-6
- OCLC: 22665566
- Dewey Decimal: 813/.54 20
- LC Class: PS3566.O92 G65 1991

The Gold Bug Variations is a novel by American writer Richard Powers, first released in 1991.

== Plot introduction ==
The novel intertwines the discovery of the chemical structure of DNA with the musicality of Johann Sebastian Bach's harpsichord composition the Goldberg Variations. A similar theme is explored by Douglas Hofstadter in his 1979 book Gödel, Escher, Bach: an Eternal Golden Braid. The title also alludes to Edgar Allan Poe's 1843 short story "The Gold-Bug", which is incorporated in the plot of the novel.

The plot hinges on two love affairs: the first set in the 1950s, between two scientists intent on discovering the mysteries of DNA; the second in the 1980s, between two lovers who befriend the scientist featured in the novel's flashbacks.

== Awards ==
The Gold Bug Variations has received the following awards:

- Time Book of the Year, 1991
- Publishers Weekly Best Books of 1991
- Vrij Nederland Best Books of 1991
- The New York Times Notable Book, 1991
- De Morgen Best Book of 1991 (named in 1999, in a compilation of the best books each year over the last half century)
- Finalist, National Book Critics Circle Award for Fiction, 1991

== See also ==
- The Preserving Machine (short story) by Philip K. Dick
