= Gain (novel) =

1998 novel by Richard Powers

- First edition (publ. Farrar, Straus & Giroux)
- Author: Richard Powers
- Language: English
- Publisher: Farrar, Straus & Giroux
- Publication date: 1998
- Publication place: United States
- Media type: Print
- Pages: 355 p.
- ISBN: 9780374159962
- OCLC: 231971293

Gain (ISBN 0-374-15996-3) is a novel by Richard Powers published by in 1998. It tells the stories of Clare International, a chemical conglomerate with origins in soap manufacturing in the early 19th century, and Laura Bodey, a 42-year-old divorcée living near Clare International's headquarters who develops ovarian cancer. It won the James Fenimore Cooper Prize for Best Historical Fiction in 1999.
