= Plowing the Dark =

2000 novel by Richard Powers

- First edition
- Author: Richard Powers
- Language: English
- Publisher: Farrar, Straus and Giroux
- Publication date: June 2000
- Publication place: United States
- Pages: 415 pp (Hardcover)
- ISBN: 0-374-23461-2
- OCLC: 42397283
- Dewey Decimal: 813/.54 21
- LC Class: PS3566.O92 P56 2000

Plowing the Dark (2000) is a novel by American writer Richard Powers. It follows two narrative threads; one of an American teacher held hostage by Lebanese Shiite terrorists, the other the construction of a high-tech virtual reality simulator.

== Plot ==
Taimur Martin, the hostage, spends five years analyzing and replaying his life while trapped in a single room. He has little outside contact. He occasionally exchanges words with his captors, and for a short interlude, he is able to communicate with nearby prisoners using a tapped Morse code. He reads a book called Great Escape. He spends most of his time thinking about his life and relationship with his girlfriend Gwen. When his story resumes after he is released, he has a child and a wife, and much time has gone by.

In the second narrative, a virtual reality machine ("The Cavern"), is being built by workers at the Realization Laboratory. The main characters are Adie Klarpol, an artist who no longer does original work; Stevie Spiegel, an engineer-turned-poet-turned-programmer; Ronan O'Reilly, an econometrician who hopes to predict the outcome of world events; and Jack "Jackdaw" Acquerelli, a young computer programming wizard. They are attempting to recreate the world inside a three-walled room. They create a completely immersive experience, but near the end, Adie realizes that the technology will be used by the military. She has to reconcile with herself but ends up creating another room that recreates the destruction and rebuilding of civilization.

The two narratives are loosely connected through the idea of what can happen in a single room, and also by themes of war and rebuilding after a war.

== Cultural references and allusions ==
As in Powers' other novels, one of his most effective devices is the use of allusion. The novel alludes to several poems including "Sailing to Byzantium" by William Butler Yeats and "The Oven Bird" by Robert Frost. Several paintings are also mentioned, including Rousseau's "The Dream" and van Gogh's "Bedroom in Arles". The title itself may be an allusion to line 20 of the poem "Earth's Answer" by William Blake.
