= Society of American Historians =

American academic organization (founded 1939)

The Society of American Historians, founded in 1939, promotes and celebrates literary excellence in the writing of American history and biography. Its roughly 300 members consist of professional historians, independent scholars, journalists, filmmakers, documentarians, novelists, poets, and biographers.

== Prizes and awards ==
The Society sponsors four awards, which are announced at its annual dinner in May:

- The Francis Parkman Prize, given annually for a non-fiction book in American history that is distinguished by its literary merit, is named for the nineteenth-century historian whose multi-volume work, France and England in North America (Boston, 1865–92), is widely praised for its elegant style as well as its historical depth.
- The Society of American Historians Prize for Historical Fiction, formerly the James Fenimore Cooper Prize, given in odd-numbered years for the best historical novel on an American theme.
- The Allan Nevins Prize, recognizing new scholarship, is given annually to the best-written doctoral dissertation on an American subject. The winning dissertation is published by one of the Society's seventeen publisher members, which include both academic and trade presses. The prize is named for the Society's chief founder.
- The Tony Horwitz Prize, honoring distinguished work in American history of wide appeal and enduring public significance, was awarded for the first time in 2020. The prize commemorates the Society's former president (2016–2017), who died in May 2019. Tony Horwitz was a Pulitzer Prize-winning journalist, a former staff writer for the New Yorker, and a distinguished historian whose distinctive voice was marked by surpassing humanity and grace. The prize is supported by The Cedars Foundation.
- From 2008 to 2017, the Arthur M. Schlesinger Jr. Award was given jointly with the Roosevelt Institute for distinguished writing in American history of enduring public significance. Schlesinger was a preeminent historian of the twentieth century as well as a public intellectual noted for giving history a voice in public affairs.

== History ==
The Society was established in 1939 by Allan Nevins and several colleagues who shared his critique of what he termed in a Saturday Review article the "pedantic school" of history—academics who, he argued, took pride in poor writing. Nevins, who taught history for more than 35 years at Columbia University, was the author of more than 50 books, including an eight-volume history of the American Civil War and biographies of John D. Rockefeller, Henry Ford, and Grover Cleveland (which won the 1933 Pulitzer Prize for Biography or Autobiography). A journalist for fifteen years before coming to Columbia (he never earned a Ph.D.), Nevins was the master of a robust and readable style, and continued throughout his life to write for radio and the popular press.

== Publications ==
In 1954, seeking to make quality historical writing accessible to a broad readership, the Society helped establish American Heritage magazine as an illustrated bimonthly publication. The Society has co-published severalmember-authored books including:

- Profiles in Leadership: Historians on the Elusive Quality of Greatness, edited by Walter Isaacson (W. W. Norton, 2010);
- Days of Destiny: Crossroads in American History, edited by James M. McPherson and Alan Brinkley (Dorling Kindersley, 2001); and
- "To the Best of My Ability": The American Presidents, edited by James M. McPherson (Dorling Kindersley, 2000).

== Administration ==
The Society's 2024/25 officers are Martha A. Sandweiss (president) and Martha Hodes (vice president). Its administrative office is based at Columbia University; it is supported largely by annual dues from individual and publisher members. It is an affiliate of the American Historical Association.
