= Galatea 2.2 =

1995 book by Richard Powers

- Cover incorporating the Raphael painting La Fornarina
- Author: Richard Powers
- Language: English
- Genre: Pseudo-autobiography, science fiction
- Publisher: Harper Perennial
- Publication date: 1995
- Publication place: United States
- Media type: Print (hard & paperback)

Galatea 2.2 is a 1995 pseudo-autobiographical novel by American writer Richard Powers and a contemporary reworking of the Pygmalion myth. The book's narrator shares the same name as Powers, with the book referencing events and books in the author's life while mentioning other events that may or may not be based upon Powers' life.

== Plot summary ==
The main narrative tells the story of Powers' return to his alma mater – referred to in the novel as simply "U.", but clearly based on the University of Illinois at Urbana-Champaign, the school Powers attended and teaches at as a professor – after he has ended a long and torrid relationship with a loving but volatile woman, referred to as "C." Powers is an in-house author for the university, and lives for free for one year. He finds himself unable to write any more books, and spends the first portion of the novel attempting to write, but never getting past the first line.

Powers then meets a computer scientist named Philip Lentz. Intrigued by Lentz's overbearing personality and unorthodox theories, Powers eventually agrees to participate in an experiment involving artificial intelligence. Lentz bets his fellow scientists that he can build a computer that can produce an analysis of a literary text that is indistinguishable from one produced by a human. It is Powers' task to "teach" the machine. After going through several unsuccessful versions, Powers and Lentz produce a computer model (dubbed "Helen") that is able to communicate like a human. It is not clear to the reader or to Powers whether she is simulating human thought or actually experiencing it. Powers tutors the computer, first by reading it canonical works of literature, then narrating current events, and eventually telling it the story of his own life, in the process developing a complicated relationship with the machine.

The novel also consists of extensive flashbacks to Powers' relationship with C., from their first meeting at U., to their bohemian life in Boston, to their move to C.'s family's town in the Netherlands.

The novel culminates with Helen being unable to bear the realities of the world, and "leaving" Powers. She asks Powers to "see everything" for her, and subsequently shuts herself down. Her exit from the world forces Powers to experience a rebirth. In addition, Powers realizes that he was Lentz's experiment: would he or wouldn't he be able to teach a computer? Through the transformation he experiences, he is suddenly able to interact with the world, and he can write again.

== Characters ==
- Richard Powers: the central character of the novel, who shares certain traits and experiences with the novelist without being a complete copy of the author.
- Lentz: a sarcastic and brilliant researcher and scientist. His wife Audrey has hypoxic brain damage caused by what the novel describes as a cardiovascular accident. She lives in a nursing home and is only intermittently able to recognise him. Lentz creates Helen in an effort to explore the workings of the human brain and somehow discover how a mere biological accident could so destroy the woman he loved.
- Helen: the creation of Lentz and Richard; Lentz builds her, and Richard educates her. She is a net, spread out over innumerable computers, and she is taught using the literary canon. Only when she is exposed to reality—the murder, rage, etc. that characterize daily news and the human world—does she realize fully that she does not belong nor does she wish to belong in this world. One of the central arguments of the book comes from Helen and whether she has human emotions, or is simply simulating human emotion.

== Background ==
Richard Powers, the author, graduated from the University of Illinois, where he learned computer programming as a user of PLATO.

== Reviews and critiques ==
Reception for the book has been mostly positive, with the Los Angeles Times praising the novel. The New York Times wrote that Galatea 2.2 was "complex" and a "heady and provocative experiment". The Washington Times expressed that the book "may not be the easiest to access, but will prove as enchanting as any." The New York Times reported that the novel "caused a small sensation among artificial intelligence specialists and neuroscientists"; philosopher Daniel Dennett sent Powers a fan letter eight pages long.

== Awards and nominations ==
- Finalist, 1995 National Book Critics Circle Award
- Time magazine Best Books of the Year, 1995
- New York Times Notable Book, 1995

== See also ==
- Galatea
- Pygmalion
