= Prisoner's Dilemma (novel) =

1988 novel by Richard Powers

- First edition
- Author: Richard Powers
- Cover artist: Cheryl Asherman
- Language: English
- Publisher: Beech Tree Books
- Publication date: 1988
- Publication place: United States
- Media type: Print (hardback & paperback)
- Pages: 248 pp.
- ISBN: 0-688-07350-6
- OCLC: 16985003
- Dewey Decimal: 813/.54 19
- LC Class: PS3566.O92 P75 1988

Prisoner's Dilemma is a 1988 novel by American author Richard Powers. It is the story of a dysfunctional family living in DeKalb County, Illinois. The novel explores the impact of history on contemporary life.

The novel centres on the father of the family, Eddie Hobson, who is trying to find a solution to the "prisoner's dilemma" posed by mathematicians at the RAND Corporation. He wishes to solve the dilemma through writing an alternate reality, explaining how human beings could live together peacefully. To do this, he uses many elements from real life twisted slightly.

== Non-fiction portrayed in the novel ==
Many of these events are portrayed differently. For example, Disney is portrayed as having Japanese ancestry, when he did not.

- Americans of Japanese Ancestry and their internment during World War II.
- 1939 New York World's Fair, held at Flushing Meadows–Corona Park in Queens, New York City, United States.
- Der Fuehrer's Face, animated cartoon made by Disney in 1942.
- Disney's Nine Old Men, chief animators at Disney.
- Walt Disney, American animator.
- Trinity test, the first testing of a nuclear weapon in 1945.
- Victory Through Air Power, part-animated propaganda movie made by Disney in 1943.
