= Robin Wall Kimmerer =

Potawatomi botanist, educator, and author (born 1953)

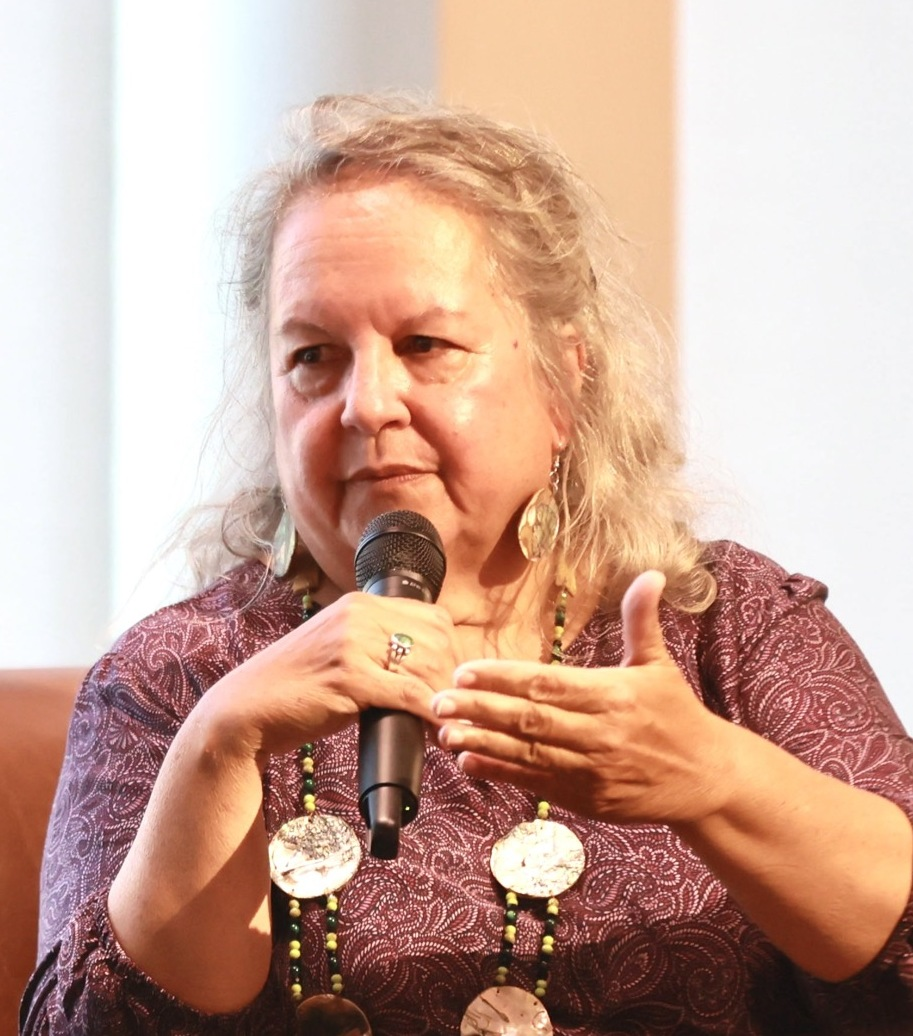
- Kimmerer in 2023
- Born: September 13, 1953 (age 73); New York, U.S.
- Citizenship: Citizen Potawatomi Nation American
- Education: SUNY-ESF (BS); University of Wisconsin–Madison (MS, PhD)
- Known for: Scholarship on traditional ecological knowledge and moss ecology; Outreach to tribal communities; Creative writing
- Awards: John Burroughs Medal Award, for Gathering Moss; MacArthur Fellowship
- Scientific career
- Fields: Plant ecology, Botany
- Workplaces: SUNY-ESF; Centre College; Transylvania University
- Thesis: Vegetation Development and Community Dynamics in a Dated Series of Abandoned Lead-Zinc Mines in Southwestern Wisconsin (1983)
- Website: www.robinwallkimmerer.com

Robin Wall Kimmerer (born September 13, 1953) is a Potawatomi botanist, author, and the former director of the Center for Native Peoples and the Environment at the State University of New York College of Environmental Science and Forestry (SUNY-ESF).

As a scientist and a Native American, Kimmerer is informed in her work by both Western science and Indigenous environmental knowledge.

Kimmerer has written numerous scientific articles and the books Gathering Moss: A Natural and Cultural History of Mosses (2003), Braiding Sweetgrass: Indigenous Wisdom, Scientific Knowledge, and the Teachings of Plants (2013), The Democracy of Species (2021) and The Serviceberry: Abundance and Reciprocity in the Natural World (2024). She narrated an audiobook version of Braiding Sweetgrass, released in 2016. Braiding Sweetgrass was republished in 2020 with a new introduction.

== Early life and education ==
Robin Wall Kimmerer was born in 1953 in upstate New York to Robert and Patricia Wall and was raised in the hamlet of Ballston Lake. Her father worked as a mechanical engineer, and her mother had a degree in chemical engineering. Her enthusiasm for the environment was encouraged by her parents, and her time outdoors inspired a deep appreciation for the natural environment. As a young child, she collected seeds and pressed leaves, storing them in shoe boxes under her bed. Kimmerer is an enrolled citizen of the Citizen Potawatomi Nation.

Kimmerer remained near home for college, attending State University of New York College of Environmental Science and Forestry and receiving a bachelor's degree in botany in 1975. She spent two years working for Bausch & Lomb as a microbiologist. Kimmerer then moved to Wisconsin to attend the University of Wisconsin–Madison, earning her master's degree in botany there in 1979, followed by her PhD in plant ecology in 1983. It was while studying forest ecology as part of her degree program that she first learnt about mosses, and bryology became the scientific focus of her career.

== Career ==
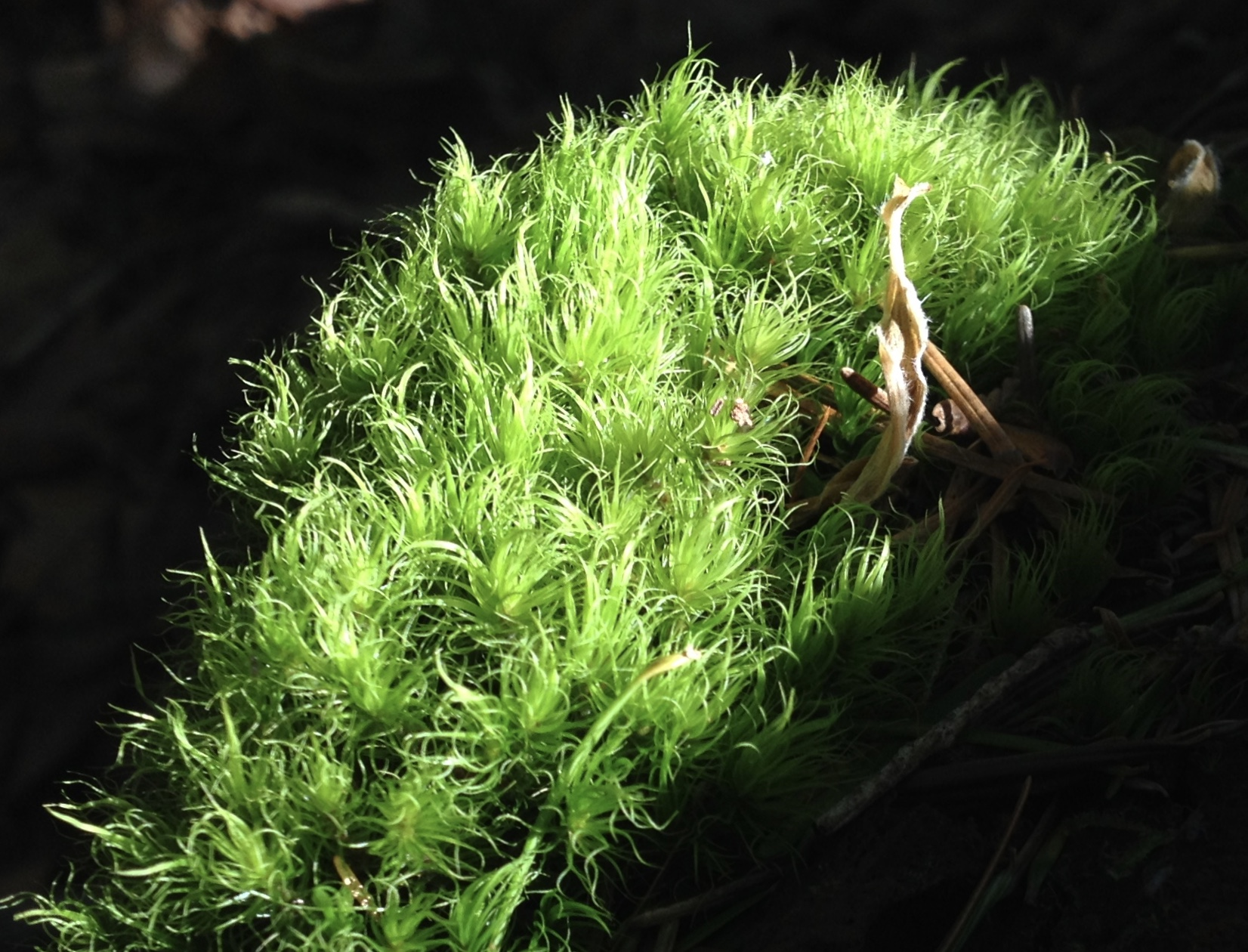
Rainforest moss

From Wisconsin, Kimmerer moved to Kentucky, where she briefly taught at Transylvania University in Lexington, before moving to Danville, Kentucky, where she taught biology, botany, and ecology at Centre College. Kimmerer received tenure at Centre College. In 1993, at age 40 Kimmerer returned home to upstate New York and her alma mater, SUNY-ESF, where she currently teaches.

Kimmerer teaches in the Environmental and Forest Biology Department at ESF. She teaches courses on land and culture, traditional ecological knowledge, ethnobotany, ecology of mosses, disturbance ecology, and general botany. She served as director of the Center for Native Peoples and the Environment at ESF, which is part of her work to provide programs that allow for greater access for Indigenous students to study environmental science, and for science to benefit from the wisdom of Native philosophy to reach the common goal of sustainability.

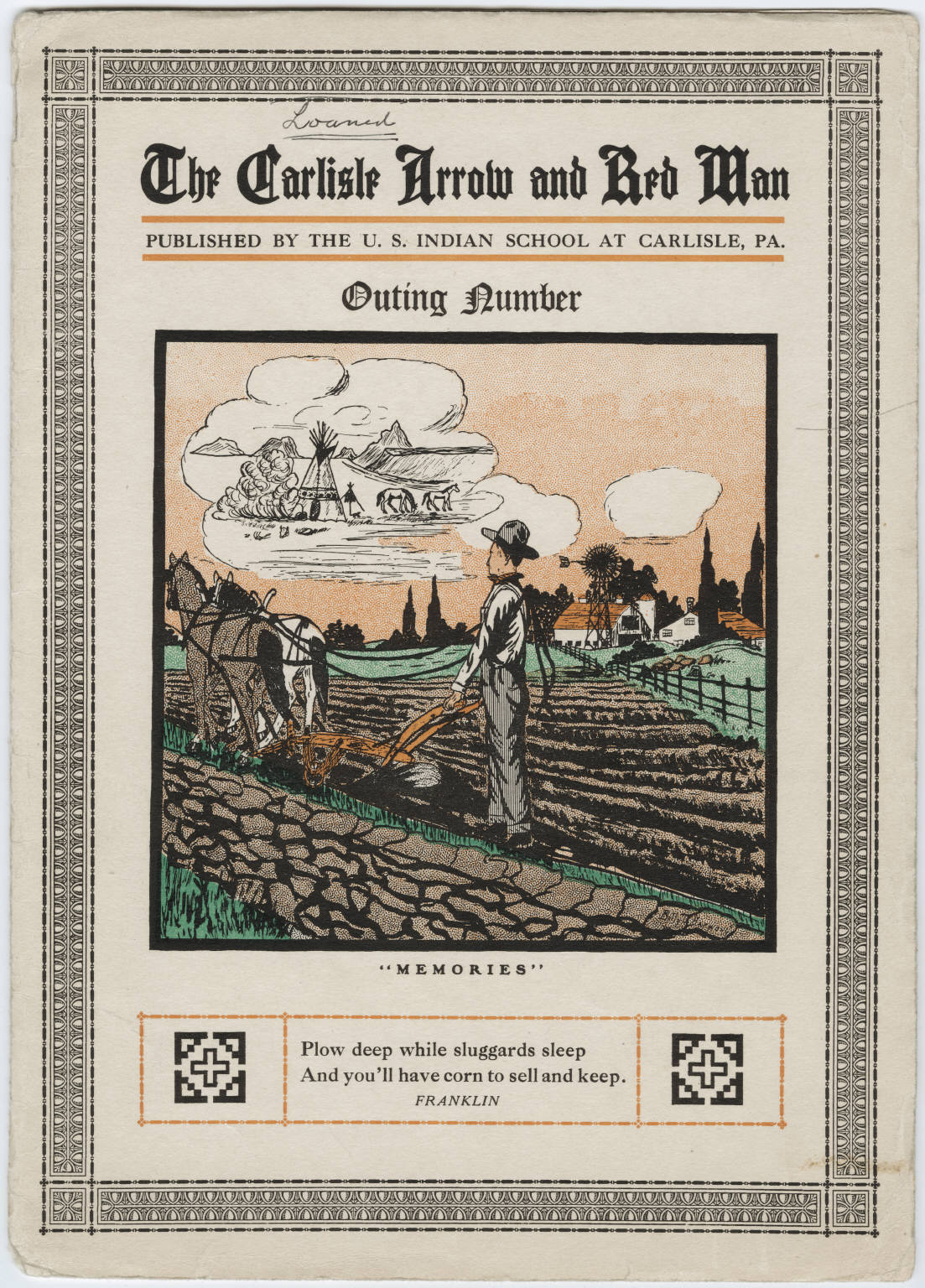
Kimmerer's grandfather attended Carlisle Indian Industrial School.

Kimmerer is a proponent of the Traditional Ecological Knowledge (TEK) approach, which she describes as a "way of knowing". TEK is an empirical approach based on long-term observation and relationship. The approach also involves cultural and spiritual considerations, often marginalized by the Western scientific community. As a botanist trained and published in Western science, she has high regard for both worldviews and their distinct practices. "Two-eyed seeing" is how she portrays the utilization of both. She also speaks in favor of communication modes unique to each of the two realms. As a university professor, academic papers were essential in the early part of her career. In her elder years she exemplifies the power of orally presented Indigenous stories for an outcome that science makes no attempt to achieve: conveyance and indirect advocacy of values.

Kimmerer's efforts are motivated in part by her family history. Her paternal grandfather, also a Citizen Potawatomi, received an assimilationist education at the Carlisle Indian Industrial School in Carlisle, Pennsylvania. The school was one of the first American Indian boarding schools, which set out to "civilize" Native children, forbidding residents from speaking their language and effectively erasing their Native culture. Knowing how important it is to maintain the Potawatomi language, Kimmerer took Potawatomi language classes to learn how to speak it because "when a language dies, so much more than words are lost".

Her current work spans traditional ecological knowledge, moss ecology, outreach to Indigenous communities, and creative writing.

== Professional service ==
Kimmerer has helped sponsor the Undergraduate Mentoring in Environmental Biology (UMEB) project, which pairs students of color with faculty members in the enviro-bio sciences while they work together to research environmental biology. Kimmerer is also a part of the United States Department of Agriculture's Higher Education Multicultural Scholars Program. The program provides students with real-world experiences that involve complex problem-solving. Kimmerer is also involved in the American Indian Science and Engineering Society (AISES), and works with the Onondaga Nation's school doing community outreach. Kimmerer also uses traditional knowledge and science collectively for ecological restoration in research. She has served on the advisory board of the Strategies for Ecology Education, Development and Sustainability (SEEDS) program, a program to increase the number of minority ecologists. Kimmerer is also the co-founder and former chair of the Traditional Ecological Knowledge Section of the Ecological Society of America.

In April 2015, Kimmerer was invited to participate as a panelist at a United Nations plenary meeting to discuss how harmony with nature can help to conserve and sustainably use natural resources, titled "Harmony with Nature: Towards achieving sustainable development goals including addressing climate change in the post-2015 Development Agenda".

== Writing influences ==
Kimmerer has credited science writer Loren Eiseley as being the first to inspire her as a writer. She has also pointed to the poet Wendell Berry as inspiration as well as Rachel Carson, the author of Silent Spring. Kimmerer said that as a pioneering female scientist, Carson "combined her knowledge with a sense of responsibility for that knowledge."

Kimmerer does most of her writing in her home office and prefers to write first drafts in longhand on lined, yellow legal-sized paper using green or purple ink.

== Honors and awards ==
Kimmerer received the John Burroughs Medal Award for her book, Gathering Moss: A Natural and Cultural History of Mosses. Her first book, it incorporated her experience as a plant ecologist and her understanding of traditional knowledge about nature. Author Elizabeth Gilbert later relied on Gathering Moss while completing research for her novel The Signature of All Things. Gilbert said of the book and Kimmerer, "That book had been my touchstone during my research. She's my Mick Jagger."

Her second book, Braiding Sweetgrass: Indigenous Wisdom, Scientific Knowledge, and the Teachings of Plants, received the 2014 Sigurd F. Olson Nature Writing Award. Braiding Sweetgrass is about the interdependence of people and the natural world, primarily the plant world. She won a second Burroughs award for an essay, "Council of the Pecans", that appeared in Orion magazine in 2013. Within ten years of its publication, more than two million copies had been sold worldwide. Kimmerer received an honorary M.Phil. degree in Human Ecology from College of the Atlantic on June 6, 2020.

In 2022, Kimmerer was awarded a MacArthur Fellowship. In 2024, Oregon State University named her the recipient of the Stone Award for Literary Achievement.

In 2023, The White house awarded Kimmerer with the National Humanities Medal.

Most recently in 2025, she was included on the Time 100 list of influential people.

Kimmerera is a fossil moss genus from the Late Cretaceous period in Antarctica that was described and named after Kimmerer in 2026.

== Works ==
- Gathering Moss: A Natural and Cultural History of Mosses (Oregon State University Press, 2003) ISBN 0-87071-499-6.
- Braiding Sweetgrass: Indigenous Wisdom, Scientific Knowledge, and the Teachings of Plants (Milkweed Editions, 2013) ISBN 9781571313355.
- The Democracy of Species (Penguin Classics, August 26, 2021) ISBN 9780141997049.
- The Serviceberry (Scribner, November 19, 2024) ISBN 9781668072240 about how the serviceberry, by sharing its abundance with its ecosystem, embodies interdependence and mutual support.
- Bud Finds Her Gift (HarperCollins, September 30, 2025) ISBN 9780063324428, children's picture book.

In anthology

- Katie Holten, ed. (2023). The Language of Trees: A Rewilding of Literature and Landscape. Tin House. ISBN 9781953534682.
