= Richard Powers =

American novelist (born 1957)

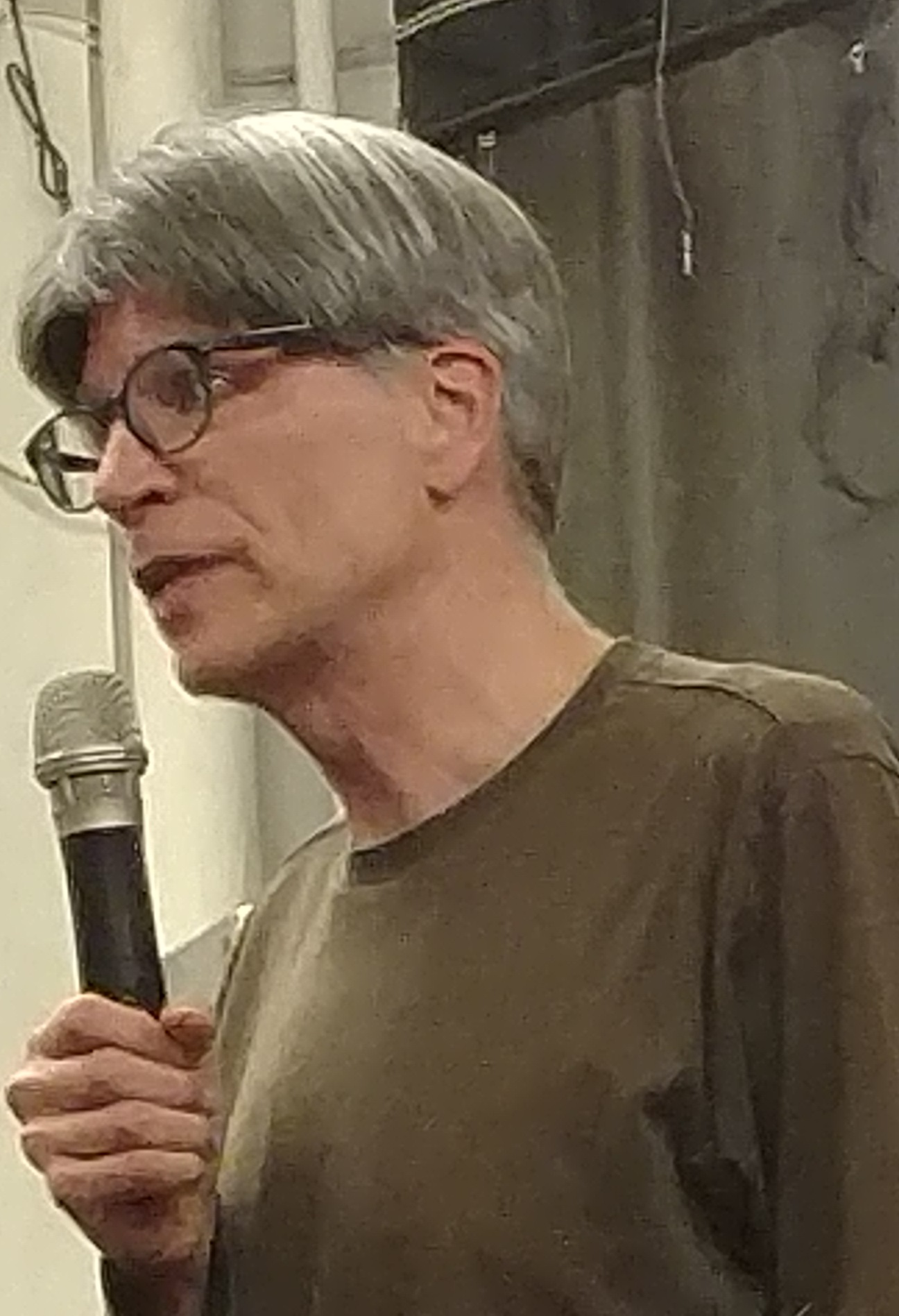
- Powers reading in April 2018
- Born: June 18, 1957 (age 69); Evanston, Illinois, U.S.
- Education: University of Illinois, Urbana-Champaign (BA, MA)
- Occupations: Writer, professor of English
- Parent(s): Richard Franklin Powers and Donna (Belik) Powers
- Writing career
- Period: 1985–present (as writer)
- Genre: Literary novels
- Website: www.richardpowers.net

Richard Powers (born June 18, 1957) is an American novelist whose works explore the effects of modern science and technology. His novel The Echo Maker won the 2006 National Book Award for Fiction. He has also won many other awards over the course of his career, including a MacArthur Fellowship. As of 2024, Powers has published fourteen novels and has taught at the University of Illinois and Stanford University. He won the 2019 Pulitzer Prize for Fiction for The Overstory.

== Life and work ==
=== Early life ===
One of five children, Powers was born in Evanston, Illinois, the son of Richard Franklin Powers and his wife Donna Powers (née Belik). His family later moved a few miles west to Lincolnwood, where his father was a local school principal. When Powers was 11, they moved to Bangkok, Thailand, where his father had accepted a position at International School Bangkok. Powers attended this through his freshman year, ending in 1972. During that time outside the U.S., he developed skills in vocal music and proficiency in cello, guitar, saxophone, and clarinet. He also became an avid reader, enjoying nonfiction primarily and classics such as the Iliad and the Odyssey.

The family returned to the U.S. when Powers was 16. Following graduation in 1975 from DeKalb High School in DeKalb, Illinois, he enrolled at the University of Illinois at Urbana–Champaign (UIUC) with a major in physics, which he switched to English literature during his first semester. He earned a BA in 1978 and an MA in Literature in 1980.

=== Professorships and awards ===
In 2010 and 2013, Powers was a Stein Visiting Writer at Stanford University, during which time he partly assisted in the lab of biochemist Aaron Straight.

Powers was named a MacArthur Fellow in 1989. He received a Lannan Literary Award in 1999.

Powers was appointed the Swanlund Professor of English at UIUC in 1996.

On August 22, 2013, Stanford University announced that Powers had been named the Phil and Penny Knight Professor of Creative Writing in the Department of English.

As of 2018, he has retired and is now professor emeritus of English at UIUC.

=== Novels ===
Powers learned computer programming at Illinois as a user of PLATO and moved to Boston to work as a programmer. One Saturday in 1980, Powers saw the 1914 photograph "Young Farmers" by August Sander at the Museum of Fine Arts, Boston. He was so inspired that he quit his job two days later to write a novel about the people in the photograph.

Powers worked for two years on his debut novel, Three Farmers on Their Way to a Dance, which was published by William Morrow in 1985. It comprises three alternating threads: a novella featuring the three young men in the photo during World War I, a technology magazine editor who is obsessed with the photo, and the author's critical and historical musings about the mechanics of photography and the life of Henry Ford. It was a National Book Critics Circle Award finalist, and received the Rosenthal Award from the American Academy and Institute of Arts and Letters. It also received a Special Citation from the PEN/Hemingway Awards.

Powers moved to the Netherlands, where he wrote Prisoner's Dilemma about The Walt Disney Company and nuclear warfare.

He followed with The Gold Bug Variations about genetics, music, and computer science. It was a National Book Critics Circle Award finalist.

In 1993, Powers wrote Operation Wandering Soul about, among other things, a genetic condition that causes accelerated aging, and an agonized young surgical trainee. It was a finalist for the National Book Award.

In 1995, Powers published the Pygmalion story Galatea 2.2 about an artificial intelligence experiment gone awry. It was a National Book Critics Circle Award finalist.

In 1998, Powers wrote Gain about a 150-year-old chemical company and a woman who lives near one of its plants and succumbs to ovarian cancer. It won the James Fenimore Cooper Prize for Best Historical Fiction in 1999.

His Plowing the Dark (2000) tells of a Seattle research team building a groundbreaking virtual reality while an American teacher is held hostage in Beirut. It received Harold D. Vursell Memorial Award from the American Academy and Institute of Arts and Letters.

Powers wrote The Time of Our Singing in 2003. It is about the musician children of an interracial couple who met at Marian Anderson's famed 1939 concert on the Lincoln Memorial steps.

Powers's ninth novel, The Echo Maker (2006), is about a Nebraska man who suffers head trauma in a truck accident and believes his caregiver sister is an impostor. It won a National Book Award and was a finalist for the Pulitzer Prize for Fiction.

Powers's tenth novel, Generosity: An Enhancement (2009) has writing professor Russell Stone encountering his former student, Thassa, an Algerian woman whose constant happiness is exploited by journalists and scientists.

In 2014, Powers wrote Orfeo, about Peter Els, a retired music composition instructor and avant-garde composer who is mistaken for a bio-terrorist after being discovered with a makeshift genetics lab in his house.

The Overstory, published in April 2018, is about nine Americans whose unique life experiences with trees bring them together to address the destruction of forests. It won the 2019 Pulitzer Prize for Fiction, was shortlisted for the Booker Prize and the $75,000 2019 PEN/Jean Stein Book Award, and was runner-up for the Dayton Literary Peace Prize.

Bewilderment, published in September 2021, was shortlisted for the 2021 Booker Prize and longlisted for the National Book Award and Andrew Carnegie Medal for Excellence in Fiction. It is described as "an astrobiologist thinks of a creative way to help his rare and troubled son in Richard Powers’ deeply moving and brilliantly original novel."

Playground (2024), the 14th novel by Powers, was longlisted for the 2024 Booker Prize.

== Bibliography ==
- —— (1985). Three Farmers on Their Way to a Dance. HarperCollins. ISBN 0688042015.
- —— (1988). Prisoner's Dilemma. McGraw Hill. ISBN 0070506124.
- —— (1991). The Gold Bug Variations. William Morrow. ISBN 0688098916.
- —— (1993). Operation Wandering Soul. HarperCollins. ISBN 0688115489.
- —— (1995). Galatea 2.2. Farrar Straus & Giroux. ISBN 0374199485.
- —— (1998). Gain. Farrar Straus & Giroux. ISBN 0312204094.
- —— (2000). Plowing the Dark. Farrar, Straus & Giroux. ISBN 0374234612.
- —— (2003). The Time of Our Singing. Farrar, Straus & Giroux. ISBN 0374277826.
- —— (2006). The Echo Maker. Farrar, Straus & Giroux. ISBN 0374146357.
- —— (2009). Generosity: An Enhancement. Farrar, Straus & Giroux. ISBN 978-0374161149.
- —— (2014). Orfeo. W. W. Norton & Company. ISBN 9780393240825.
- —— (2018). The Overstory. W. W. Norton & Company. ISBN 9780393635522.
- —— (2021). Bewilderment. W. W. Norton & Company. ISBN 9780393881141.
- —— (2024). Playground. W. W. Norton & Company. ISBN 9781324086031.
- Late Light (2027)

== Awards and recognition ==
- 1985 Rosenthal Award of the American Academy and Institute of Arts and Letters
- 1985 PEN/Hemingway Award Special Citation
- 1989 MacArthur Fellowship
- 1991 Time Book of the Year
- 1993 Finalist, National Book Award
- 1996 Swanlund Professorship, University of Illinois
- 1998 Business Week Best Business Books of 1998
- 1998 Elected Fellow, American Academy of Arts and Sciences
- 1999 James Fenimore Cooper Prize, Society of American Historians
- 1999 Lannan Literary Award
- 2000 Harold D. Vursell Memorial Award, American Academy and Institute of Arts and Letters
- 2000 Elected Fellow, Center for Advanced Study, University of Illinois
- 2001 Corrington Award for Literary Excellence, Centenary College
- 2001 Author of the Year, Illinois Association of Teachers of English
- 2003 Pushcart Prize
- 2003 Dos Passos Prize for Literature, Longwood University
- 2003 W. H. Smith Literary Award (Great Britain)
- 2004 Ambassador Book Award
- 2006 National Book Award for Fiction
- New York Times Notable Book, 2003, 2000, 1998, 1995, 1991
- Best Books of 2003: Chicago Tribune, Christian Science Monitor, St. Louis Post-Dispatch, Newsday, London Evening Standard, Time Out (London), San Jose Mercury News
- Finalist, National Book Critics Circle Award, 2003, 1995, 1991, 1985
- 2006 Finalist, Pulitzer Prize for Fiction
- 2010 Elected Member, American Academy of Arts and Letters
- 2014 Man Booker Prize (longlist)
- 2014 California Book Awards Silver Medal Fiction winner for Orfeo
- 2018 Man Booker Prize (shortlist)
- 2019 Pulitzer Prize for Fiction
- 2019 PEN Oakland Josephine Miles Literary Award for The Overstory
- 2020 William Dean Howells Medal for The Overstory
- 2021 Booker Prize (shortlist)
- 2021 National Book Award (longlist)
- 2024 Booker Prize (longlist)
